The following is a list of video games published by Sony Interactive Entertainment, formerly known as Sony Computer Entertainment.

Video games

{| class="wikitable sortable" style="width: 100%"
|+ 
! scope="col" | Title
! scope="col" | System
! scope="col" | Original release date
! scope="col" | Developer(s)
! scope="col" | Notes
! scope="col" class="unsortable" | Ref(s)
|-

! scope="row" | Crime Crackers
| PlayStation
| 
| Media.VisionJapan Studio
| Japan only
|
|-
! scope="row" | Motor Toon Grand Prix
| PlayStation
| 
| Polyphony Digital
| Japan only
|
|-
! scope="row" | Battle Arena Toshinden
| PlayStation
| 
| Tamsoft
| Co-published with Takara in North America and PAL only
|
|-
! scope="row" | Cyber Sled
| PlayStation
| 
| Namco
| Co-Published with Namco in PAL only
|
|-
! scope="row" | Kileak: The Blood
| PlayStation
| 
| Genki
|
|
|-
! scope="row" | The Raiden Project
| PlayStation
| 
| Seibu Kaihatsu
| North America only
|
|-
! scope="row" | Tekken
| PlayStation
| 
| Namco
| Co-published with Namco in PAL only
|
|-
! scope="row" | Jumping Flash!
| PlayStation
| 
| ExactUltra
|
|
|-
! scope="row" | Rapid Reload
| PlayStation
| 
| Media.VisionJapan Studio
| Japan and PAL only
|
|-
! scope="row" | Air Combat
| PlayStation
| 
| Namco
| Co-published with Namco in PAL only
|
|-
! scope="row" | Arc the Lad
| PlayStation
| 
| G-CraftJapan Studio
| Japan only
| 
|-
! scope="row" | Philosoma
| PlayStation
| 
| Epics
|
|
|-
! scope="row" | ESPN Extreme Games/1Xtreme
| PlayStation
| 
| 989 Sports
|
|
|-
! scope="row" | Hermie Hopperhead: Scrap Panic
| PlayStation
| 
| Yuke's
| Japan only
|
|-
! scope="row" | Novastorm
| PlayStation
| 
| Psygnosis
| Published by Psygnosis
|
|-
! scope="row" | Wipeout
| PlayStation
| 
| Psygnosis
| Published by Psygnosis
|
|-
! scope="row" | Mortal Kombat 3
| PlayStation
| 
| Midway Games
| Co-published with Midway Games
|
|-
! scope="row" | Destruction Derby
| PlayStation
| 
| Reflections Interactive
| Published by Psygnosis
|
|-
! scope="row" | 3D Lemmings
| PlayStation
| 
| Clockwork Games
| Published by Psygnosis
|
|-
! scope="row" | Beyond the Beyond
| PlayStation
| 
| Camelot Software PlanningJapan Studio
| Japan & North America only
|
|-
! scope="row" | Twisted Metal
| PlayStation
| 
| SingleTrac
|
|
|-
! scope="row" | Warhawk
| PlayStation
| 
| SingleTrac
|
|
|-
! scope="row" | NHL FaceOff
| PlayStation
| 
| 989 Sports
| North America and PAL only
|
|-
! scope="row" | Ridge Racer
| PlayStation
| 
| Namco
| Co-published with Namco in PAL only
|
|-
! scope="row" | Project: Horned Owl
| PlayStation
| 
| Alfa SystemMovic
| Japan and North America only
|
|-
!Demo 1
|PlayStation
|
|
|
|
|-
! scope="row" | Discworld
| PlayStation
| 
| Perfect Entertainment
| Published by Psygnosis
| 
|-
! scope="row" | Sengoku Cyber: Fujimaru Jigokuhen
| PlayStation
| 
| Japan Studio
| Japan only
|
|-
! scope="row" | Sentou Kokka: Air Land Battle
| PlayStation
| 
| Japan Studio
| Japan only
|
|-
! scope="row" | Shanghai: Banri no Choujou
| PlayStation
| 
| Japan Studio
| Japan only
|
|-
! scope="row" | Victory Zone
| PlayStation
| 
| Japan Studio
| Japan only
|
|-
! scope="row" | Wizardry VII: Gadeia no Houshu
| PlayStation
| 
| Sir-Tech Software
| Japan only
| 
|-
! scope="row" | Krazy Ivan
| PlayStation
| 
| Psygnosis
| Published by Psygnosis
|
|-
! scope="row" | NBA ShootOut
| PlayStation
| 
| Team Soho
|
|
|-
! scope="row" | Crash Bandicoot
| PlayStation
| 
| Naughty Dog
|
|
|-
! scope="row" | Formula 1
| PlayStation
| 
| Bizarre Creations
| Published by Psygnosis
|
|-
! scope="row" | Arc the Lad II
| PlayStation
| 
| G-CraftJapan Studio
| Japan only
|
|-
!Krazy Ivan
| Microsoft Windows, Sega Saturn
| 
| Psygnosis
| Published by Psygnosis
|
|-
! scope="row" | 2Xtreme
| PlayStation
| 
| 989 Sports
| 
| 
|-
! scope="row" | A-IV Evolution Global
| PlayStation
| 
| Artdink
| Co-published with Artdink in PAL only
| 
|-
! scope="row" | Adidas Power Soccer
| PlayStation
| 
| Psygnosis
| Published by Psygnosis
| 
|-
! scope="row" | Aquanaut's Holiday
| PlayStation
| 
| Artdink
| North America and PAL only
| 
|-
! scope="row" | Assault Rigs
| PlayStation
| 
| Psygnosis
| Published by Psygnosis
| 
|-
! scope="row" | Battle Arena Toshinden 2
| PlayStation
| 
| Tamsoft
| Co-published with Takara in PAL only
| 
|-
! scope="row" | Broken Sword: The Shadow of the Templars
| PlayStation
| 
| Revolution Software
| PAL only
| 
|-
! scope="row" | Chronicles of the Sword
| PlayStation
| 
| Synthetic Dimensions
| Published by Psygnosis in North America and PAL only
| 
|-
! scope="row" | Cool Boarders
| PlayStation
| 
| UEP Systems
| North America and PAL only
| 
|-
! scope="row" | Defcon 5
| PlayStation
| 
| Millennium Interactive
| Published by Psygnosis in PAL only
| 
|-
! scope="row" | Destruction Derby 2
| PlayStation
| 
| Reflections Interactive
| Published by Psygnosis
| 
|-
! scope="row" | Epidemic
| PlayStation
| 
| Genki
| 
| 
|-
! scope="row" | Galaxian^3
| PlayStation
| 
| Namco
| Co-published with Namco in PAL only
| 
|-
! scope="row" | Jet Moto
| PlayStation
| 
| SingleTrac
| 
| 
|-
! scope="row" | Jumping Flash! 2
| PlayStation
| 
| ExactMuuMuu
| 
| 
|-
! scope="row" | Mickey's Wild Adventure
| PlayStation
| 
| Traveller's Tales
| Co-published with Disney Interactive in PAL only
| 
|-
! scope="row" | MLB Pennant Race
| PlayStation
| 
| 989 Sports
| North America only
| 
|-
! scope="row" | Motor Toon Grand Prix 2
| PlayStation
| 
| Polyphony Digital
| 
| 
|-
! scope="row" | Myst
| PlayStation
| 
| Cyan WorldsAlfa System
| Published by Psygnosis
| 
|-
! scope="row" | Namco Museum Vol. 1
| PlayStation
| 
| Namco
| Co-published with Namco in PAL only
| 
|-
! scope="row" | Namco Museum Vol. 2
| PlayStation
| 
| Namco
| Co-published with Namco in PAL only
| 
|-
! scope="row" | Namco Soccer Prime Goal
| PlayStation
| 
| Namco
| Co-published with Namco in PAL only
| 
|-
! scope="row" | Namco Tennis Smash Court
| PlayStation
| 
| Namco
| Co-published with Namco in PAL only
| 
|-
! scope="row" | NCAA GameBreaker
| PlayStation
| 
| 989 Sports
| North America only
| 
|-
! scope="row" | NFL GameDay
| PlayStation
| 
| 989 Sports
| North America and PAL only
| 
|-
! scope="row" | NFL GameDay 97
| PlayStation
| 
| 989 Sports
| North America only
| 
|-
! scope="row" | NHL FaceOff '97
| PlayStation
| 
| Killer Game
| 
| 
|-
! scope="row" | Pandemonium
| PlayStation
| 
| Toys for Bob
| Co-published with Crystal Dynamics in PAL only
| 
|-
! scope="row" | PaRappa the Rapper
| PlayStation
| 
| NanaOn-ShaJapan Studio
| 
| 
|-
! scope="row" | Penny Racers
| PlayStation
| 
| Taito
| Co-published with Takara in PAL only
| 
|-
! scope="row" | Popolocrois Story
| PlayStation
| 
| Epics
| Japan only
| 
|-
! scope="row" | Raging Skies
| PlayStation
| 
| Pegasus JapanBit Town
| Co-published with Asmik Ace Entertainment in PAL only
| 
|-
! scope="row" | RayStorm
| PlayStation
| 
| Taito
| Co-published with Taito in PAL only
| 
|-
! scope="row" | Ridge Racer Revolution
| PlayStation
| 
| Namco
| Co-published with Namco in PAL only
| 
|-
! scope="row" | Samurai Shodown III: Blades of Blood
| PlayStation
| 
| SNK
| Co-published with SNK in North America and PAL only
| 
|-
! scope="row" | StarBlade Alpha
| PlayStation
| 
| Namco
| Co-published with Namco in PAL only
| 
|-
! scope="row" | Tekken 2
| PlayStation
| 
| Namco
| Co-published with Namco in PAL only
| 
|-
! scope="row" | The Adventures of Lomax
| PlayStation
| 
| Psygnosis
| Published by Psygnosis
| 
|-
! scope="row" | The King of Fighters '95
| PlayStation
| 
| SNK
| Co-published with SNK in North America and PAL only
| 
|-
! scope="row" | Tobal No. 1
| PlayStation
| 
| DreamFactory
| Co-published with Squaresoft in North America and PAL only
| 
|-
! scope="row" | Twisted Metal 2
| PlayStation
| 
| SingleTrac
| 
| 
|-
! scope="row" | Victory Zone 2
| PlayStation
| 
| Japan Studio
| Japan only
| 
|-
! scope="row" | Wipeout 2097
| PlayStation
| 
| Psygnosis
| Published by Psygnosis
| 
|-
! scope="row" | Alundra
| PlayStation
| 
| Matrix SoftwareJapan Studio
| Published by Sony Computer Entertainment in Japan and by Psygnosis in PAL only
|
|-
!Formula 1
| Microsoft Windows
| 
| Bizarre Creations
| Published by Psygnosis
|
|-
! scope="row" | Arc the Lad: Monster Game with Casino Game
| PlayStation
| 
| G-CraftJapan Studio
| Japan only
|
|-
! scope="row" | Crime Crackers 2
| PlayStation
| 
| Media.VisionJapan Studio
| Japan only
|
|-

! scope="row" | Ace Combat 2
| PlayStation
| 
| Namco
| Co-published with Namco in PAL only
| 
|-
! scope="row" | Adidas Power Soccer International 97
| PlayStation
| 
| Psygnosis
| Published by Psygnosis
| 
|-
! scope="row" | Battle Arena Toshinden 3
| PlayStation
| 
| Tamsoft
| Co-published with Takara in PAL only
| 
|-
! scope="row" | Bloody Roar
| PlayStation
| 
| Hudson Soft
| North America only
| 
|-
! scope="row" | Broken Sword II: The Smoking Mirror
| PlayStation
| 
| Revolution Software
| PAL only
| 
|-
! scope="row" | Bushido Blade
| PlayStation
| 
| Lightweight
| Co-published with Squaresoft in North America and PAL only
| 
|-
! scope="row" | Carnage Heart
| PlayStation
| 
| Artdink
| Co-published with Artdink in North America and PAL only
| 
|-
! scope="row" | CART World Series
| PlayStation
| 
| 989 Studios
| North America only
| 
|-
! scope="row" | Colony Wars
| PlayStation
| 
| Psygnosis
| Published by Psygnosis
| 
|-
! scope="row" | Cool Boarders 2
| PlayStation
| 
| UEP Systems
| North America and PAL only
| 
|-
! scope="row" | Crash Bandicoot 2: Cortex Strikes Back
| PlayStation
| 
| Naughty Dog
| 
| 
|-
! scope="row" | Discworld II: Missing Presumed...?!
| PlayStation
| 
| Perfect Entertainment
| Published by Psygnosis
| 
|-
! scope="row" | Disney's Hercules
| PlayStation
| 
| Eurocom
| Co-published with Disney Interactive in PAL only
| 
|-
! scope="row" | Final Fantasy VII
| PlayStation
| 
| Squaresoft
| Co-published with Squaresoft in North America and PAL only
| 
|-
! scope="row" | Formula 1 97
| PlayStation
| 
| Bizarre Creations
| Published by Psygnosis
| 
|-
! scope="row" | Formula 1 97
| Microsoft Windows
| 
| Bizarre Creations
| Published by Psygnosis
| 
|-
! scope="row" | G-Police
| PlayStation
| 
| Psygnosis
| Published by Psygnosis
| 
|-
! scope="row" | Ghost in the Shell
| PlayStation
| 
| Japan Studio
| Japan and PAL only
| 
|-
! scope="row" | I.Q.: Intelligent Qube
| PlayStation
| 
| Epics
| 
| 
|-
! scope="row" | Jet Moto 2
| PlayStation
| 
| SingleTrac
| 
| 
|-
! scope="row" | King's Field
| PlayStation
| 
| FromSoftware
| Co-published with FromSoftware in PAL only
| 
|-
! scope="row" | League of Pain
| PlayStation
| 
| Beyond Reality
| Published by Psygnosis
| 
|-
! scope="row" | Lifeforce Tenka
| PlayStation
| 
| Psygnosis
| Published by Psygnosis in North America and PAL only
| 
|-
! scope="row" | MLB 98
| PlayStation
| 
| 989 Sports
| North America only
| 
|-
! scope="row" | Monster Trucks
| PlayStation
| 
| Reflections Interactive
| Published by Psygnosis in North America and PAL only
| 
|-
! scope="row" | Namco Museum Vol. 3
| PlayStation
| 
| Namco
| Co-published with Namco in PAL only
| 
|-
! scope="row" | Namco Museum Vol. 4
| PlayStation
| 
| Namco
| Co-published with Namco in PAL only
| 
|-
! scope="row" | Namco Museum Vol. 5
| PlayStation
| 
| Namco
| Co-published with Namco in PAL only
| 
|-
! scope="row" | NBA ShootOut '97
| PlayStation
| 
| Team Soho
| 
| 
|-
! scope="row" | NCAA Gamebreaker 98
| PlayStation
| 
| 989 Sports
| North America only
| 
|-
! scope="row" | NFL GameDay 98
| PlayStation
| 
| 989 Sports
| North America only
| 
|-
! scope="row" | NHL FaceOff 98
| PlayStation
| 
| Killer Game
| North America and PAL only
| 
|-
! scope="row" | Overboard!
| PlayStation
| 
| Psygnosis
| Published by Psygnosis
| 
|-
! scope="row" | Porsche Challenge
| PlayStation
| 
| Team Soho
| 
| 
|-
! scope="row" | Princess Maker: Yumemiru Yousei
| PlayStation
| 
| Gainax
| Japan only
| 
|-
! scope="row" | Quest for Fame
| PlayStation
| 
| Virtual Music Entertainment
| Japan only
| 
|-
! scope="row" | Rage Racer
| PlayStation
| 
| Namco
| Co-published with Namco in PAL only
| 
|-
! scope="row" | Rally Cross
| PlayStation
| 
| 989 Studios
| 
| 
|-
! scope="row" | Rapid Racer
| PlayStation
| 
| Team Soho
| 
| 
|-
! scope="row" | Ray Tracers
| PlayStation
| 
| Taito
| Co-published with Taito in PAL only
| 
|-
! scope="row" | Real Bout Fatal Fury
| PlayStation
| 
| SNK
| Co-published with SNK in PAL only
| 
|-
! scope="row" | Rosco McQueen Firefighter Extreme
| PlayStation
| 
| Slippery Snake Studio
| Published by Psygnosis
| 
|-
! scope="row" | Rush Hour
| PlayStation
| 
| Clockwork Games
| Published by Psygnosis
| 
|-
! scope="row" | Sentient
| PlayStation
| 
| Psygnosis
| Published by Psygnosis in North America only
| 
|-
! scope="row" | Shadow Master
| PlayStation
| 
| HammerHead
| Published by Psygnosis in North America and PAL only
| 
|-
! scope="row" | Soul Blade
| PlayStation
| 
| Namco (Project Soul)
| Co-published with Namco in PAL only
| 
|-
! scope="row" | Spawn: The Eternal
| PlayStation
| 
| 989 Studios
| 
| 
|-
! scope="row" | Steel Reign
| PlayStation
| 
| Chantemar Creations
| 
| 
|-
! scope="row" | Tail of the Sun
| PlayStation
| 
| Artdink
| Co-published with Artdink in North America only
| 
|-
! scope="row" | The City of Lost Children
| PlayStation
| 
| Psygnosis
| Published by Psygnosis in North America and PAL only
| 
|-
! scope="row" | Time Crisis
| PlayStation
| 
| Namco
| Co-published with Namco in PAL only
| 
|-
! scope="row" | Velldeselba Senki Tsubasa no Kunshou
| PlayStation
| 
| Japan Studio
| Japan only
| 
|-
! scope="row" | Wild Arms
| PlayStation
| 
| Media.VisionJapan Studio
| 
| 
|-
! scope="row" | Xevious 3D/G+
| PlayStation
| 
| Namco
| Co-published with Namco in PAL only
| 
|-
! scope="row" | Z
| PlayStation
| 
| The Bitmap Brothers
| Co-published with GT Interactive in PAL only
| 
|-
! scope="row" | Adidas Power Soccer 98
| PlayStation
| 
| Shen Technologies
| Published by Psygnosis
| 
|-
! scope="row" | Armored Core
| PlayStation
| 
| FromSoftware
| Co-published with FromSoftware in PAL only
| 
|-
! scope="row" | Baby Universe
| PlayStation
| 
| 
| Japan and PAL only
| 
|-
! scope="row" | Blast Radius
| PlayStation
| 
| Psygnosis
| Published by Psygnosis
| 
|-
! scope="row" | Blasto
| PlayStation
| 
| 989 Studios
| 
| 
|-
! scope="row" | Bomberman World
| PlayStation
| 
| Hudson Soft
| Co-published with Hudson Soft in PAL only
| 
|-
! scope="row" | Bust a Groove
| PlayStation
| 
| Metro
| Co-published with Enix by 989 Studios in North America and by Sony Computer Entertainment in PAL only
| 
|-
! scope="row" | Cardinal Syn
| PlayStation
| 
| Kronos Digital Entertainment
| 
| 
|-
! scope="row" | Colony Wars: Vengeance
| PlayStation
| 
| Psygnosis
| Published by Psygnosis
| 
|-
! scope="row" | Contender
| PlayStation
| 
| Victor Interactive Software
| North America only
| 
|-
! scope="row" | Cool Boarders 3
| PlayStation
| 
| Idol Minds
| Published by 989 Sports in North America and by Sony Computer Entertainment in PAL only
| 
|-
! scope="row" | Crash Bandicoot: Warped
| PlayStation
| 
| Naughty Dog
| 
| 
|-
! scope="row" | Dead or Alive
| PlayStation
| 
| Tecmo
| Co-published with Tecmo in PAL only
| 
|-
! scope="row" | Devil Dice
| PlayStation
| 
| Shift
| Japan and PAL only
| 
|-
! scope="row" | Double Cast
| PlayStation
| 
| Sugar and Rockets
| Japan only
| 
|-
! scope="row" | A Bug's Life
| PlayStation
| 
| Traveller's Tales
| Co-published with Disney Interactive
| 
|-
! scope="row" | Ehrgeiz: God Bless the Ring
| PlayStation
| 
| DreamFactory
| Co-published with Squaresoft in Japan and PAL only
| 
|-
! scope="row" | Einhänder
| PlayStation
| 
| Squaresoft
| Co-published with Squaresoft in North America only
| 
|-
! scope="row" | ESPN X Games Pro Boarder
| PlayStation
| 
| Radical Entertainment
| Co-published with ESPN Digital Games in PAL only
| 
|-
! scope="row" | Everybody's Golf
| PlayStation
| 
| Camelot Software PlanningJapan Studio
| 
| 
|-
! scope="row" | Final Fantasy Tactics
| PlayStation
| 
| Squaresoft
| Co-published with Squaresoft in North America only
| 
|-
! scope="row" | Fluid
| PlayStation
| 
| Opus
| Japan and PAL only
| 
|-
! scope="row" | Formula 1 98
| PlayStation
| 
| Visual Science
| Published by Psygnosis in North America and PAL only
| 
|-
! scope="row" | Gran Turismo
| PlayStation
| 
| Polyphony Digital
| 
| 
|-
! scope="row" | Jersey Devil
| PlayStation
| 
| Behaviour Interactive
| North America only
| 
|-
! scope="row" | Kisetsu o Dakishimete
| PlayStation
| 
| Sugar and Rockets
| Japan only
| 
|-
! scope="row" | Klonoa: Door to Phantomile
| PlayStation
| 
| Namco
| Co-published with Namco in PAL only
| 
|-
! scope="row" | Kula World
| PlayStation
| 
| Game Design Sweden AB
| Published by Sony Computer Entertainment in Japan and PAL, and by Psygnosis in North America only
| 
|-
! scope="row" | Legend of Legaia
| PlayStation
| 
| ProkionContrail
| 
| 
|-
! scope="row" | Libero Grande
| PlayStation
| 
| Namco
| Co-published with Namco in PAL only
| 
|-
! scope="row" | MediEvil
| PlayStation
| 
| Cambridge Studio
| 
| 
|-
! scope="row" | MLB 99
| PlayStation
| 
| 989 Sports
| North America only
| 
|-
! scope="row" | NBA ShootOut 98
| PlayStation
| 
| 989 Sports
| Published by 989 Sports in North America and by Sony Computer Entertainment in PAL only
| 
|-
! scope="row" | NCAA Final Four 99
| PlayStation
| 
| 989 Sports
| Published by 989 Sports in North America only
| 
|-
! scope="row" | NCAA Gamebreaker 99
| PlayStation
| 
| 989 Sports
| Published by 989 Sports in North America only
| 
|-
! scope="row" | Newman/Haas Racing
| PlayStation
| 
| Studio 33
| Published by Psygnosis
| 
|-
! scope="row" | NFL GameDay 99
| PlayStation
| 
| Red Zone Interactive989 Sports
| Published by 989 Sports in North America only
| 
|-
! scope="row" | NFL Xtreme
| PlayStation
| 
| 989 Sports
| Published by 989 Sports in North America and by Sony Computer Entertainment in PAL only
| 
|-
! scope="row" | NHL FaceOff 99
| PlayStation
| 
| Killer Game
| Published by 989 Sports in North America and PAL only
| 
|-
! scope="row" | Nightmare Creatures
| PlayStation
| 
| Kalisto Entertainment
| Co-published with Kalisto Entertainment in PAL only
| 
|-
! scope="row" | O.D.T. – Escape... Or Die Trying
| PlayStation
| 
| FDI
| Published by Psygnosis
| 
|-
! scope="row" | Oh No! More Lemmings
| PlayStation
| 
| DMA Design
| Published by Psygnosis
| 
|-
! scope="row" | Pet in TV
| PlayStation
| 
| MuuMuu
| Japan and PAL only
| 
|-
! scope="row" | Point Blank
| PlayStation
| 
| Namco
| Co-published with Namco in PAL only
| 
|-
! scope="row" | PoPoLoCrois
| PlayStation
| 
| Epics 
| Japan only
| 
|-
! scope="row" | Psybadek
| PlayStation
| 
| Psygnosis
| Published by Psygnosis in North America and PAL only
| 
|-
! scope="row" | Rally Cross 2
| PlayStation
| 
| Idol Minds
| 
| 
|-
! scope="row" | Rascal
| PlayStation
| 
| Traveller's Tales
| Published by Psygnosis in North America and PAL only
| 
|-
! scope="row" | Running Wild
| PlayStation
| 
| Blue Shift, Inc.
| 
| 
|-
! scope="row" | SaGa Frontier
| PlayStation
| 
| Squaresoft
| Co-published with Squaresoft in North America only
| 
|-
! scope="row" | Sampaguita
| PlayStation
| 
| Sugar and Rockets
| Japan only
| 
|-
! scope="row" | Sentinel Returns
| PlayStation
| 
| Hookstone
| Published by Psygnosis
| 
|-
! scope="row" | Souten no Shiroki Kami no Za: Great Peak
| PlayStation
| 
| Pandora Box
| Japan only
| 
|-
! scope="row" | Spice World
| PlayStation
| 
| Team Soho
| Published by Sony Computer Entertainment in PAL and by Psygnosis in North America only
| 
|-
! scope="row" | Spyro the Dragon
| PlayStation
| 
| Insomniac Games
| 
| 
|-
! scope="row" | Tekken 3
| PlayStation
| 
| Namco
| Co-published with Namco in PAL only
| 
|-
! scope="row" | The Fifth Element
| PlayStation
| 
| Kalisto Entertainment
| Co-published with Kalisto Entertainment in PAL only
| 
|-
! scope="row" | Tomba!
| PlayStation
| 
| Whoopee Camp
| North America and PAL only
| 
|-
! scope="row" | Treasures of the Deep
| PlayStation
| 
| Black Ops Entertainment
| Co-published with Namco in PAL only
| 
|-
! scope="row" | Twisted Metal III
| PlayStation
| 
| 989 Studios
| Published by 989 Studios in North America only
| 
|-
! scope="row" | Yukiwari no Hana
| PlayStation
| 
| Sugar and Rockets
| Japan only
| 
|-
! scope="row" | Zero Divide 2
| PlayStation
| 
| Zoom
| Co-published with Zoom in PAL only
| 
|-

! scope="row" | 3Xtreme
| PlayStation
| 
| 989 Sports
| Published by 989 Sports in North America only
| 
|-
! scope="row" | Alundra 2: A New Legend Begins
| PlayStation
| 
| Matrix SoftwareJapan Studio
| Japan only
| 
|-
! scope="row" | Anna Kournikova's Smash Court Tennis
| PlayStation
| 
| Namco
| Co-published with Namco in PAL only
| 
|-
! scope="row" | Ape Escape
| PlayStation
| 
| Japan Studio
| 
| 
|-
! scope="row" | Arc the Lad III
| PlayStation
| 
| ARC EntertainmentJapan Studio
| Japan only
| 
|-
! scope="row" | Attack of the Saucerman
| PlayStation
| 
| Fube Industries
| Published by Psygnosis
| 
|-
! scope="row" | Barbie: Race & Ride
| PlayStation
| 
| Runecraft
| PAL only
| 
|-
! scope="row" | Bloodlines
| PlayStation
| 
| 
| PAL only
| 
|-
! scope="row" | Bloody Roar II
| PlayStation
| 
| Hudson Soft
| North America only
| 
|-
! scope="row" | Brightis
| PlayStation
| 
| Quintet
| Japan only
| 
|-
! scope="row" | Cool Boarders 4
| PlayStation
| 
| Idol Minds
| Published by 989 Sports in North America and PAL only
| 
|-
! scope="row" | Crash Team Racing
| PlayStation
| 
| Naughty Dog
| 
| 
|-
! scope="row" | Destrega
| PlayStation
| 
| Omega Force
| Co-published with Koei in PAL only
| 
|-
! scope="row" | Disney•Pixar A Bug's Life Activity Center
| PlayStation
| 
| 
| Co-published with Disney Interactive in PAL only
| 
|-
! scope="row" | Disney's Magical Tetris
| PlayStation
| 
| Capcom
| Co-published with Disney Interactive in PAL only
| 
|-
! scope="row" | Disney's Tarzan
| PlayStation
| 
| Eurocom
| Co-published with Disney Interactive in PAL only
| 
|-
! scope="row" | Doko Demo Issyo
| PlayStation
| 
| 
| Japan only
| 
|-
! scope="row" | Eliminator
| PlayStation
| 
| Magenta Software
| Published by Psygnosis
| 
|-
! scope="row" | Final Fantasy VIII
| PlayStation
| 
| Squaresoft
| Co-published with Squaresoft in PAL, China, Hong Kong and Singapore only
| 
|-
! scope="row" | Formula One 99
| PlayStation
| 
| Studio 33
| Published by Psygnosis in North America and Japan, and by Sony Computer Entertainment in PAL
| 
|-
! scope="row" | Formula One 99
| Microsoft Windows
| 
| Studio 33
| Published by Psygnosis in North America and Japan, and by Sony Computer Entertainment in PAL
| 
|-
! scope="row" | G-Police: Weapons of Justice
| PlayStation
| 
| Psygnosis
| Published by Psygnosis in North America and by Sony Computer Entertainment in PAL only
| 
|-
! scope="row" | Global Domination
| PlayStation
| 
| Impressions Games
| Published by Psygnosis
| 
|-
! scope="row" | Global Force: Shin Sentou Kokka
| PlayStation
| 
| Marionette
| Japan only
| 
|-
! scope="row" | Gran Turismo 2
| PlayStation
| 
| Polyphony Digital
| 
| 
|-
! scope="row" | Grandia
| PlayStation
| 
| Game Arts
| North America only
| 
|-
! scope="row" | Jet Moto 3
| PlayStation
| 
| Locomotive Games
| Published by 989 Sports in North America only
| 
|-
! scope="row" | Kingsley's Adventure
| PlayStation
| 
| Psygnosis
| Published by Psygnosis in North America and PAL only
| 
|-
! scope="row" | Kurushi Final: Mental Blocks
| PlayStation
| 
| Epics
| 
| 
|-
! scope="row" | Love & Destroy
| PlayStation
| 
| ARC EntertainmentInti Creates
| Japan only
| 
|-
! scope="row" | MLB 2000
| PlayStation
| 
| 989 Sports
| Published by 989 Sports in North America only
| 
|-
! scope="row" | NBA ShootOut 2000
| PlayStation
| 
| 989 Sports
| Published by 989 Sports in North America only
| 
|-
! scope="row" | NCAA Final Four 99
| PlayStation
| 
| Killer Game
| Published by 989 Sports in North America only
| 
|-
! scope="row" | NCAA Final Four 2000
| PlayStation
| 
| 989 Sports
| Published by 989 Sports in North America only
| 
|-
! scope="row" | NCAA Gamebreaker 2000
| PlayStation
| 
| Red Zone Interactive
| Published by 989 Sports in North America only
| 
|-
! scope="row" | NFL GameDay 2000
| PlayStation
| 
| Red Zone Interactive989 Sports
| Published by 989 Sports in North America only
| 
|-
! scope="row" | NFL Xtreme 2
| PlayStation
| 
| 989 Sports
| Published by 989 Sports in North America only
| 
|-
! scope="row" | NHL FaceOff 2000
| PlayStation
| 
| SolWorks
| Published by 989 Sports in North America and by Sony Computer Entertainment in PAL only
| 
|-
! scope="row" | Omega Boost
| PlayStation
| 
| Polyphony Digital
| 
| 
|-
! scope="row" | Ore no Ryouri
| PlayStation
| 
| Argent
| Japan only
| 
|-
! scope="row" | Over My Remain/Ore no Shikabane o Koete Yuke
| PlayStation
| 
| Japan Studio
| Japan only
| 
|-
! scope="row" | Point Blank 2
| PlayStation
| 
| Namco
| Co-published with Namco in PAL only
| 
|-
! scope="row" | Pro 18: World Tour Golf
| PlayStation
| 
| Intelligent Games
| Published by Psygnosis
| 
|-
! scope="row" | R-Type Delta
| PlayStation
| 
| Irem
| Co-published with Irem in PAL only
| 
|-
! scope="row" | R4: Ridge Racer Type 4
| PlayStation
| 
| Namco
| Co-published with Namco in PAL only
| 
|-
! scope="row" | Retro Force
| PlayStation
| 
| Psygnosis
| Published by Psygnosis in PAL only
| 
|-
! scope="row" | Rollcage
| PlayStation
| 
| Attention to Detail
| Published by Psygnosis
| 
|-
! scope="row" | Speed Freaks
| PlayStation
| 
| Funcom
| North America and PAL only
| 
|-
! scope="row" | Spyro 2: Ripto's Rage!
| PlayStation
| 
| Insomniac Games
| 
| 
|-
! scope="row" | Star Ocean: The Second Story
| PlayStation
| 
| tri-Ace
| Co-published with Enix in North America and PAL only
| 
|-
! scope="row" | Supercross Circuit
| PlayStation
| 
| Idol Minds
| Published by 989 Sports in North America only
| 
|-
! scope="row" | Syphon Filter
| PlayStation
| 
| Bend Studio
| Published by 989 Studios in North America and by Sony Computer Entertainment in PAL only
| 
|-
! scope="row" | Tamago de Puzzle
| PlayStation
| 
| Matrix SoftwareJapan Studio
| 
| 
|-
! scope="row" | The Granstream Saga
| PlayStation
| 
| Quintet
| Published by Sony Computer Entertainment in Japan and co-published with ARC Entertainment in PAL only
| 
|-
! scope="row" | The X-Files Game
| PlayStation
| 
| HyperBole Studios
| Co-published with Fox Interactive in PAL only
| 
|-
! scope="row" | This is Football
| PlayStation
| 
| Team Soho
| 
| 
|-
! scope="row" | Tiny Tank: Up Your Arsenal
| PlayStation
| 
| Appaloosa InteractiveAndNow
| North America and PAL only
| 
|-
! scope="row" | Tiny Toon Adventures: Buster and the beanstalk
| PlayStation
| 
| Terraglyph Interactive Studios
| PAL only
| 
|-
! scope="row" | Tomba! 2: The Evil Swine Return
| PlayStation
| 
| Whoopee Camp
| North America and PAL only
| 
|-
! scope="row" | Tomoyasu Hotei: Stolen Song
| PlayStation
| 
| Japan Studio
| Japan only
| 
|-
! scope="row" | Twisted Metal 4
| PlayStation
| 
| 989 Studios
| Published by 989 Studios in North America only
| 
|-
! scope="row" | UmJammer Lammy
| PlayStation
| 
| NanaOn-ShaJapan Studio
| 
| 
|-
! scope="row" | Vib-Ribbon
| PlayStation
| 
| NanaOn-ShaJapan Studio
| Japan and PAL only
| 
|-
! scope="row" | Wipeout 3
| PlayStation
| 
| Psygnosis
| Published by Sony Computer Entertainment in PAL and Japan, and by Psygnosis in North America
| 
|-
! scope="row" | XI Jumbo
| PlayStation
| 
| Shift
| Japan only
| 
|-

! scope="row" | Ace Combat 3: Electrosphere
| PlayStation
| 
| Namco
| Co-published with Namco in PAL only
| 
|-
! scope="row" | Aconcagua
| PlayStation
| 
| Japan Studio
| Japan only
| 
|-
! scope="row" | Barbie Super Sports
| PlayStation
| 
| Runecraft
| PAL only
| 
|-
! scope="row" | Bealphareth
| PlayStation
| 
| Zealsoft
| Japan only
| 
|-
! scope="row" | Boku no Natsuyasumi
| PlayStation
| 
| Millennium Kitchen
| Japan only
| 
|-
! scope="row" | Colin McRae Rally
| PlayStation
| 
| Codemasters
| North America only
| 
|-
! scope="row" | Colony Wars: Red Sun
| PlayStation
| 
| Psygnosis
| Published by Psygnosis
| 
|-
! scope="row" | Cool Boarders 2001
| PlayStation
| 
| Idol Minds
| North America only
| 
|-
! scope="row" | Covert Ops: Nuclear Dawn
| PlayStation
| 
| Japan Studio
| Japan and PAL only
| 
|-
! scope="row" | Crash Bash
| PlayStation
| 
| Eurocom
| 
| 
|-
! scope="row" | Destruction Derby Raw
| PlayStation
| 
| Studio 33
| PAL only
| 
|-
! scope="row" | Disney's Aladdin in Nasira's Revenge
| PlayStation
| 
| Argonaut Games
| Co-published with Disney Interactive in PAL and North America only
| 
|-
! scope="row" | Disney's Story Studio: Mulan
| PlayStation
| 
| Media Station
| Co-published with Disney Interactive in PAL only
| 
|-
! scope="row" | Disney's The Emperor's New Groove
| PlayStation
| 
| Argonaut Games
| Co-published with Disney Interactive in North America and PAL only
| 
|-
! scope="row" | Dragon Valor
| PlayStation
| 
| Namco
| Co-published with Namco in PAL only
| 
|-
! scope="row" | Everybody's Golf 2
| PlayStation
| 
| Clap HanzJapan Studio
| 
| 
|-
! scope="row" | Formula One 2000
| PlayStation
| 
| Studio 33
| North America and PAL only
| 
|-
! scope="row" | Ghoul Panic
| PlayStation
| 
| Eighting
| Co-published with Namco in PAL only
| 
|-
! scope="row" | Grind Session
| PlayStation
| 
| Shaba Games
| North America and PAL only
| 
|-
! scope="row" | Jackie Chan Stuntmaster
| PlayStation
| 
| Radical Entertainment
| Co-published with Radical Entertainment in PAL only
| 
|-
! scope="row" | In Cold Blood
| PlayStation
| 
| Revolution Software
| PAL only
| 
|-
! scope="row" | The Legend of Dragoon
| PlayStation
| 
| Japan Studio
| 
| 
|-
! scope="row" | Magical Dice Kids
| PlayStation
| 
| Japan Studio
| Japan only
| 
|-
! scope="row" | MediEvil 2
| PlayStation
| 
| Cambridge Studio
| 
| 
|-
! scope="row" | MLB 2001
| PlayStation
| 
| 989 Sports
| North America only
| 
|-
! scope="row" | Monster Rancher
| PlayStation
| 
| Tecmo
| Co-published with Tecmo in PAL only
| 
|-
! scope="row" | Moto Racer World Tour
| PlayStation
| 
| Delphine Software International
| PAL only
| 
|-
! scope="row" | Mr. Driller
| PlayStation
| 
| Namco
| Co-published with Namco in PAL only
| 
|-
! scope="row" | Ms. Pac-Man Maze Madness
| PlayStation
| 
| Namco
| Co-published with Namco in PAL only
| 
|-
! scope="row" | Muppet Monster Adventure
| PlayStation
| 
| Magenta Software
| PAL only
| 
|-
! scope="row" | Muppet RaceMania
| PlayStation
| 
| Traveller's Tales
| PAL only
| 
|-
! scope="row" | NBA ShootOut 2001
| PlayStation
| 
| 989 Sports
| North America only
| 
|-
! scope="row" | NBA ShootOut 2001
| PlayStation 2
| 
| 989 Sports
| North America only
| 
|-
! scope="row" | NCAA Final Four 2000
| PlayStation, PlayStation 2
| 
| 989 Sports
| North America only
| 
|-
! scope="row" | NCAA Gamebreaker 2001
| PlayStation
| 
| 989 Sports
| North America only
| 
|-
! scope="row" | NCAA Gamebreaker 2001
| PlayStation 2
| 
| 989 Sports
| North America only
| 
|-
! scope="row" | NFL GameDay 2001
| PlayStation PlayStation 2
| 
| 989 Sports
| North America only
| 
|-
! scope="row" | NHL FaceOff 2001
| PlayStation
| 
| SolWorks989 Sports
| North America only
| 
|-
! scope="row" | NHL FaceOff 2001
| PlayStation 2
| 
| SolWorks989 Sports
| North America only
| 
|-
! scope="row" | Pac-Man World
| PlayStation
| 
| Namco
| Co-published with Namco in PAL only
| 
|-
! scope="row" | Popolocrois Story II
| PlayStation
| 
| Epics
| Japan only
| 
|-
! scope="row" | Rescue Shot
| PlayStation
| 
| Now Production
| Co-published with Namco in PAL only
| 
|-
! scope="row" | Rollcage Stage II
| PlayStation
| 
| Attention to Detail
| PAL only
| 
|-
! scope="row" | Shachou Eiyuuden: The Eagle Shooting Heroes
| PlayStation
| 
| 
| Japan only
| 
|-
! scope="row" | Shadow Madness
| PlayStation
| 
| Crave Entertainment
| Co-published with Crave Entertainment in PAL only
| 
|-
! scope="row" | Space Debris
| PlayStation
| 
| 
| PAL only
| 
|-
! scope="row" | Spyro: Year of the Dragon
| PlayStation
| 
| Insomniac Games
| 
| 
|-
! scope="row" | Star Ixiom
| PlayStation
| 
| Namco
| Co-published with Namco in PAL only
| 
|-
! scope="row" | Syphon Filter 2
| PlayStation
| 
| Bend Studio
| Published by 989 Studios in North America and by Sony Computer Entertainment in PAL only
| 
|-
! scope="row" | Team Buddies
| PlayStation
| 
| Psygnosis
| PAL only
| 
|-
! scope="row" | Terracon
| PlayStation
| 
| Picture House
| PAL only
| 
|-
! scope="row" | This is Football 2
| PlayStation
| 
| Team Soho
| 
| 
|-
! scope="row" | Walt Disney's The Jungle Book Groove Party
| PlayStation
| 
| Ubisoft Montreal
| Co-published with Disney Interactive in PAL only
| 
|-
! scope="row" | Who Wants to Be a Millionaire 2nd Edition
| PlayStation
| 
| Jellyvision
| North America only
| 
|-
! scope="row" | Wild 9
| PlayStation
| 
| Shiny Entertainment
| Co-published with Interplay in Japan only
| 
|-
! scope="row" | Wild Arms 2
| PlayStation
| 
| Media.VisionJapan Studio
| Japan and North America only
| 
|-
! scope="row" | Wipeout 3: Special Edition
| PlayStation
| 
| Psygnosis
| PAL only
| 
|-

! scope="row" | C-12: Final Resistance
| PlayStation
| 
| Cambridge Studio
| 
| 
|-
! scope="row" | Monsters, Inc. Scream Team
| PlayStation, 
| 
| Behaviour Interactive
| Co-published with Disney Interactive in North America and PAL only
| 
|-
! scope="row" | Atlantis: The Lost Empire
| PlayStation
| 
| Eurocom
| Co-published with Disney Interactive
| 
|-
! scope="row" | Party Time with Winnie The Pooh
| PlayStation
| 
| Doki Denki Studio
| Co-published with Electronic Arts in PAL only
| 
|-
! scope="row" | The Little Mermaid II
| PlayStation
| 
| Blitz Games
| Co-published with THQ in PAL only
| 
|-
! scope="row" | Formula One 2001
| PlayStation, PlayStation 2
| 
| Studio 33 (PS)Studio Liverpool (PS2)
| PAL only
| 
|-
! scope="row" | Libero Grande International
| PlayStation
| 
| Namco 
| Co-published with Namco in PAL only
| 
|-
! scope="row" | MLB 2002
| PlayStation
| 
| 989 Sports
| North America only
| 
|-
! scope="row" | NCAA Final Four 2002
| PlayStation
| 
| 989 Sports
| North America only
| 
|-
! scope="row" | NBA ShootOut 2002
| PlayStation
| 
| 989 Sports
| North America only
| 
|-
! scope="row" | NFL GameDay 2002
| PlayStation
| 
| Red Zone Interactive989 Sports
| North America only
| 
|-
! scope="row" | NFL GameDay 2002
| PlayStation 2
| 
| Red Zone Interactive989 Sports
| North America only
| 
|-
! scope="row" | Point Blank 3
| PlayStation
| 
| Namco
| Co-published with Namco in PAL only
| 
|-
! scope="row" | Syphon Filter 3
| PlayStation
| 
| Bend Studio
| 
| 
|-
! scope="row" | Time Crisis: Project Titan
| PlayStation
| 
| Flying Tiger Entertainment
| Co-published with Namco in PAL only
| 
|-
! scope="row" | Twisted Metal: Small Brawl
| PlayStation
| 
| Incognito Entertainment
| North America only
| 
|-
! scope="row" | Who Wants to Be a Millionaire 3rd Edition
| PlayStation
| 
| Jellyvision
| North America only
| 
|-

! scope="row" | Alfred Chicken
| PlayStation
| 
| Twilight
| PAL only
| 
|-
! scope="row" | Treasure Planet
| PlayStation, PlayStation 2
| 
| Magenta SoftwareBizarre Creations
| Co-published with Disney Interactive
| 
|-
! scope="row" | Lilo & Stitch: Trouble in Paradise
| PlayStation
| 
| Blitz Games
| Co-published with Disney Interactive
| 
|-
! scope="row" | Final Fantasy VI
| PlayStation
| 
| Squaresoft
| Co-published with Squaresoft in PAL only
| 
|-
! scope="row" | Final Fantasy Anthology
| PlayStation
| 
| Squaresoft
| Co-published with Squaresoft in PAL only
| 
|-
! scope="row" | Firebugs
| PlayStation
| 
| Attention to Detail
| PAL only
| 
|-
! scope="row" | Formula One Arcade
| PlayStation
| 
| Studio 33
| PAL only
| 
|-
! scope="row" | Jim Henson's The Hoobs
| PlayStation
| 
| Runecraft
| PAL only
| 
|-
! scope="row" | Klonoa Beach Volleyball
| PlayStation
| 
| Namco
| Co-published with Namco in PAL only
| 
|-
! scope="row" | MLB 2003
| PlayStation
| 
| 989 Sports
| North America only
| 
|-
! scope="row" | NBA ShootOut 2003
| PlayStation
| 
| 989 Sports
| North America only
| 
|-
! scope="row" | NBA ShootOut 2003
| PlayStation 2
| 
| 989 Sports
| North America only
| 
|-
! scope="row" | NFL GameDay 2003
| PlayStation
| 
| 989 Sports
| North America only
| 
|-
! scope="row" | NFL GameDay 2003
| PlayStation 2
| 
| 989 Sports
| North America only
| 
|-
! scope="row" | Peter Pan in Disney's Return to Never Land
| PlayStation
| 
| 
| Co-published with Disney Interactive
| 
|-
! scope="row" | Stuart Little 2
| PlayStation
| 
| Creations
| North America and PAL only
| 
|-
! scope="row" | WRC: FIA World Rally Championship Arcade
| PlayStation
| 
| Unique Development Studios
| PAL only
| 
|-

! scope="row" | Jinx
| PlayStation
| 
| HammerHead
| PAL only
| 
|-
! scope="row" | MLB 2004
| PlayStation
| 
| 989 Sports
| North America only
| 
|-
! scope="row" | MLB 2004
| PlayStation 2
| 
| 989 Sports
| North America only
| 
|-
! scope="row" | NBA ShootOut 2004
| PlayStation
| 
| 989 Sports
| North America only
| 
|-
! scope="row" | NBA ShootOut 2004
| PlayStation 2
| 
| 989 Sports
| North America only
| 
|-
! scope="row" | NFL GameDay 2004
| PlayStation, PlayStation 2
| 
| 989 Sports
| North America only
| 
|-
! scope="row" | MLB 2005
| PlayStation
| 
| 989 Sports
| North America only
| 
|-
! scope="row" | MLB 2005
| PlayStation 2
| 
| 989 Sports
| North America only
| 
|-
! scope="row" | NFL GameDay 2005
| PlayStation
| 
| 989 Sports
| North America only
| 
|-

! scope="row" | Bikkuri Mouse
| PlayStation 2
| 
| Japan Studio
| Japan only
| 
|-
! scope="row" | Blood: The Last Vampire - Gekan
| PlayStation 2
| 
| Japan Studio
| Japan only
| 
|-
! scope="row" | Blood: The Last Vampire - Joukan
| PlayStation 2
| 
| Japan Studio
| Japan only
| 
|-
! scope="row" | Dead or Alive 2
| PlayStation 2
| 
| Team Ninja
| Co-published with Tecmo in PAL only
| 
|-
! scope="row" | FantaVision
| PlayStation 2
| 
| Japan Studio
| 
| 
|-
! scope="row" | Ridge Racer V
| PlayStation 2
| 
| Namco
| Co-published with Namco in PAL only
| 
|-
! scope="row" | Scandal
| PlayStation 2
| 
| Japan Studio
| Japan only
| 
|-
! scope="row" | Tekken Tag Tournament
| PlayStation 2
| 
| Namco
| Co-published with Namco in PAL only
| 
|-
! scope="row" | TVDJ
| PlayStation 2
| 
| 
| Japan only
| 
|-

! scope="row" | AirBlade
| PlayStation 2
| 
| Criterion Games
| PAL only
| 
|-
! scope="row" | Bravo Music: Christmas Edition
| PlayStation 2
| 
| Desert Productions
| Japan only
| 
|-
! scope="row" | Cool Boarders 2001
| PlayStation 2
| 
| Idol Minds
| North America only
| 
|-
! scope="row" | ATV Offroad Fury
| PlayStation 2
| 
| Rainbow Studios
| 
| 
|-
! scope="row" | Dark Cloud
| PlayStation 2
| 
| Level-5Japan Studio
| 
| 
|-
! scope="row" | Extermination
| PlayStation 2
| 
| Deep Space
| 
| 
|-
! scope="row" | Frequency
| PlayStation 2
| 
| Harmonix
| North America and PAL only
| 
|-
! scope="row" | Genshi no Kotoba
| PlayStation 2
| 
| 
| Japan only
| 
|-
! scope="row" | Gran Turismo 3: A-Spec
| PlayStation 2
| 
| Polyphony Digital
| 
| 
|-
! scope="row" | Gran Turismo Concept Tokyo 2001
| PlayStation 2
| 
| Polyphony Digital
| Japan only
| 
|-
! scope="row" | Gran Turismo Concept Tokyo-Geneva
| PlayStation 2
| 
| Polyphony Digital
| PAL only
| 
|-
! scope="row" | Gran Turismo Concept Tokyo-Seoul
| PlayStation 2
| 
| Polyphony Digital
| South-Korea only
| 
|-
! scope="row" | Ico
| PlayStation 2
| 
| Japan Studio (Team Ico)
| 
| 
|-
! scope="row" | Jak and Daxter: The Precursor Legacy
| PlayStation 2
| 
| Naughty Dog
| 
| 
|-
! scope="row" | Kinetica
| PlayStation 2
| 
| Santa Monica Studio
| North America only
| 
|-
! scope="row" | Klonoa 2: Lunatea's Veil
| PlayStation 2
| 
| Namco
| Co-published with Namco in PAL only
| 
|-
! scope="row" | Legaia 2: Duel Saga
| PlayStation 2
| 
| Prokion
| Japan only
| 
|-
! scope="row" | Mad Maestro!
| PlayStation 2
| 
| Desert Productions
| Japan only
| 
|-
! scope="row" | Mister Mosquito
| PlayStation 2
| 
| Zoom
| Japan only
| 
|-
! scope="row" | MotoGP
| PlayStation 2
| 
| Namco
| Co-published with Namco in PAL only
| 
|-
! scope="row" | Okage: Shadow King
| PlayStation 2
| 
| Zener Works
| North America and Japan only
| 
|-
! scope="row" | PaRappa the Rapper 2
| PlayStation 2
| 
| NanaOn-ShaJapan Studio
| 
| 
|-
! scope="row" | Pipo Saru 2001
| PlayStation 2
| 
| Japan Studio
| Japan only
| 
|-
! scope="row" | Rimo-Cocoron
| PlayStation 2
| 
| 
| Japan only
| 
|-
! scope="row" | Sagashi ni Ikouyo
| PlayStation 2
| 
| 
| Japan only
| 
|-
! scope="row" | SkyGunner
| PlayStation 2
| 
| PixelArts
| Japan only
| 
|-
! scope="row" | Sky Odyssey
| PlayStation 2
| 
| Cross
| Japan and PAL only
| 
|-
! scope="row" | The Bouncer
| PlayStation 2
| 
| SquaresoftDreamFactory
| Co-published with Squaresoft in PAL only
| 
|-
! scope="row" | The Yamanote Sen: Train Simulator Real
| PlayStation 2
| 
| 
| Japan only
| 
|-
! scope="row" | Time Crisis II
| PlayStation 2
| 
| Namco
| Co-published with Namco in PAL only
| 
|-
! scope="row" | This is Football 2002
| PlayStation 2
| 
| Team Soho
| PAL and North America only
| 
|-
! scope="row" | Tsungai: Atonement
| PlayStation 2
| 
| Cattle CallJapan Studio
| Japan only
| 
|-
! scope="row" | Twisted Metal: Black
| PlayStation 2
| 
| Incognito Entertainment
| 
| 
|-
! scope="row" | Vampire Night
| PlayStation 2
| 
| Wow Entertainment
| Co-published with Namco in PAL only
| 
|-
! scope="row" | Yoake no Mariko
| PlayStation 2
| 
| Japan Studio
| Japan only
| 
|-
! scope="row" | WRC
| PlayStation 2
| 
| Evolution Studios
| 
| 
|-

! scope="row" | Ace Combat: Distant Thunder
| PlayStation 2
| 
| Namco
| Co-published with Namco in PAL only, released as Ace Combat 04: Shattered Skies in NTSC regions.  
| 
|-
! scope="row" | Alpine Racer 3
| PlayStation 2
| 
| Namco
| Co-published with Namco in PAL only
| 
|-
! scope="row" | ATV Offroad Fury 2
| PlayStation 2
| 
| Rainbow Studios
| North America only
| 
|-
! scope="row" | Boku no Natsuyasumi 2: Umi no Bokuen Hen
| PlayStation 2
| 
| Millennium Kitchen
| Japan only
| 
|-
! scope="row" | Bravo Music: Chou-Meikyokuban
| PlayStation 2
| 
| Desert Productions
| Japan only
| 
|-
! scope="row" | Disney's Stitch: Experiment 626
| PlayStation 2
| 
| High Voltage Software
| 
| 
|-
! scope="row" | Drakan: The Ancients' Gates
| PlayStation 2
| 
| Surreal Software
| North America and PAL only
| 
|-
! scope="row" | Dropship: United Peace Front
| PlayStation 2
| 
| Psygnosis
| PAL only
| 
|-
! scope="row" | Dual Hearts
| PlayStation 2
| 
| Matrix SoftwareJapan Studio
| Japan only
| 
|-
! scope="row" | Ecco the Dolphin: Defender of the Future
| PlayStation 2
| 
| Appaloosa Interactive
| Co-published with Sega in PAL only
| 
|-
! scope="row" | Everybody's Golf 3
| PlayStation 2
| 
| Clap HanzJapan Studio
| Japan and North America only
| 
|-
! scope="row" | Ferrari F355 Challenge
| PlayStation 2
| 
| Sega
| Co-published with Sega in PAL only
| 
|-
! scope="row" | Final Fantasy X
| PlayStation 2
| 
| Squaresoft
| Co-published with Squaresoft in PAL only
| 
|-
! scope="row" | Formula One 2002
| PlayStation 2
| 
| Studio Liverpool
| 
| 
|-
! scope="row" | Futari no Fantasvision
| PlayStation 2
| 
| Japan Studio
| Japan only
| 
|-
! scope="row" | Gacharoku
| PlayStation 2
| 
| 
| Japan only
| 
|-
! scope="row" | Headhunter
| PlayStation 2
| 
| Amuze
| Co-published with Sega in PAL only
| 
|-
! scope="row" | Jet X20
| PlayStation 2
| 
| Killer Game
| North America only
| 
|-
! scope="row" | Kingdom Hearts
| PlayStation 2
| 
| Squaresoft
| Co-published with Squaresoft in PAL only
| 
|-
! scope="row" | Let's Bravo Music
| PlayStation 2
| 
| Desert Productions
| Japan only
| 
|-
! scope="row" | MotoGP 2
| PlayStation 2
| 
| Namco
| Co-published with Namco in PAL only
| 
|-
! scope="row" | NCAA Final Four 2003
| PlayStation 2
| 
| Killer Game
| North America only
| 
|-
! scope="row" | NCAA Gamebreaker 2003
| PlayStation 2
| 
| 989 Sports
| North America only
| 
|-
! scope="row" | NHL FaceOff 2003
| PlayStation 2
| 
| SolWorks
| North America only
| 
|-
! scope="row" | Ninja Assault
| PlayStation 2
| 
| NamcoNOW Production
| Co-published with Namco in PAL only
| 
|-
! scope="row" | Otostaz
| PlayStation 2
| 
| Japan Studio
| Japan only
| 
|-
! scope="row" | Peter Pan in Disney's Return to Never Land
| PlayStation 2
| 
| 
| Co-published with Disney Interactive
| 
|-
! scope="row" | Poinie's Poin
| PlayStation 2
| 
| 
| Japan only
| 
|-
! scope="row" | Popolocrois: Adventure of Beginnings
| PlayStation 2
| 
| Epics
| Japan only
| 
|-
! scope="row" | Ratchet & Clank
| PlayStation 2
| 
| Insomniac Games
| 
| 
|-
! scope="row" | Rez
| PlayStation 2
| 
| United Game Artists
| Co-published with Sega in PAL only
| 
|-
! scope="row" | Sly Cooper and the Thievius Raccoonus
| PlayStation 2
| 
| Sucker Punch Productions
| 
| 
|-
! scope="row" | Smash Court Tennis Pro Tournament
| PlayStation 2
| 
| Namco
| Co-published with Namco in PAL only
| 
|-
! scope="row" | SOCOM U.S. Navy SEALs
| PlayStation 2
| 
| Zipper Interactive
| 
| 
|-
! scope="row" | Space Channel 5
| PlayStation 2
| 
| United Game Artists
| Co-published with Sega in PAL only
| 
|-
! scope="row" | Space Fishermen
| PlayStation 2
| 
| 
| Japan only
| 
|-
! scope="row" | Surveillance Kanshisha
| PlayStation 2
| 
| Japan Studio
| Japan only
| 
|-
! scope="row" | Tekken 4
| PlayStation 2
| 
| Namco
| Co-published with Namco in PAL only
| 
|-
! scope="row" | The Getaway
| PlayStation 2
| 
| Team Soho
| 
| 
|-
! scope="row" | The Keihin Kyuukou: Train Simulator Real
| PlayStation 2
| 
| 
| Japan only
| 
|-
! scope="row" | The Mark of Kri
| PlayStation 2
| 
| San Diego Studio
| North America and PAL only
| 
|-
! scope="row" | This is Football 2003
| PlayStation 2
| 
| London Studio
| 
| 
|-
! scope="row" | Twisted Metal: Black Online
| PlayStation 2
| 
| Incognito Entertainment
| 
| 
|-
! scope="row" | Virtua Fighter 4
| PlayStation 2
| 
| Sega
| Co-published with Sega in PAL only
| 
|-
! scope="row" | Yoake no Mariko 2nd Act
| PlayStation 2
| 
| Japan Studio
| Japan only
| 
|-
! scope="row" | Wild Arms 3
| PlayStation 2
| 
| Media.VisionJapan Studio
| Japan and North America only
| 
|-
! scope="row" | Wipeout Fusion
| PlayStation 2
| 
| Studio Liverpool
| 
| 
|-
! scope="row" | WRC II Extreme
| PlayStation 2
| 
| Evolution Studios
| 
| 
|-
! scope="row" | XI Go
| PlayStation 2
| 
| Shift
| Japan only
| 
|-

! scope="row" | Amplitude
| PlayStation 2
| 
| Harmonix
| North America and PAL only
| 
|-
! scope="row" | Ape Escape 2
| PlayStation 2
| 
| Japan Studio
| Japan and PAL only
| 
|-
! scope="row" | Arc the Lad: Twilight of the Spirits
| PlayStation 2
| 
| Cattle CallJapan Studio
| 
| 
|-
! scope="row" | Dark Chronicle
| PlayStation 2
| 
| Level-5Japan Studio
| 
| 
|-
! scope="row" | Deka Voice
| PlayStation 2
| 
| 
| Japan only
| 
|-
! scope="row" | Dog's Life
| PlayStation 2
| 
| Frontier Developments
| PAL only
| 
|-
! scope="row" | Downhill Domination
| PlayStation 2
| 
| Incognito Entertainment
| North America and Japan only
| 
|-
! scope="row" | EverQuest Online Adventures
| PlayStation 2
| 
| Sony Online Entertainment
| Published by Sony Online Entertainment in North America and by Sony Computer Entertainment in PAL only
| 
|-
! scope="row" | EverQuest Online Adventures: Frontiers
| PlayStation 2
| 
| Sony Online Entertainment
| Published by Sony Online Entertainment in North America only
| 
|-
! scope="row" | EyeToy: Play
| PlayStation 2
| 
| London Studio
| 
| 
|-
! scope="row" | EyeToy: Groove
| PlayStation 2
| 
| London Studio
| 
| 
|-
! scope="row" | Flipnic: Ultimate Pinball
| PlayStation 2
| 
| Japan Studio
| Japan only
| 
|-
! scope="row" | Formula One 2003
| PlayStation 2
| 
| Studio Liverpool
| 
| 
|-
! scope="row" | Gacharoku 2: Kondo wa Sekai Isshuu yo
| PlayStation 2
| 
| 
| Japan only
| 
|-
! scope="row" | Ghosthunter
| PlayStation 2
| 
| Cambridge Studio
| PAL only
| 
|-
! scope="row" | Hardware: Online Arena
| PlayStation 2
| 
| London Studio
| PAL and Korea only
| 
|-
! scope="row" | Jak II
| PlayStation 2
| 
| Naughty Dog
| 
| 
|-
! scope="row" | Kuma Uta
| PlayStation 2
| 
| 
| Japan only
| 
|-
! scope="row" | Lifeline
| PlayStation 2
| 
| Japan Studio
| Japan only
| 
|-
! scope="row" | Jampack Winter 2003
| PlayStation 2
| 
| 
| North America only
| 
|-
! scope="row" | Mojib-Ribbon
| PlayStation 2
| 
| NanaOn-ShaJapan Studio
| Japan only
| 
|-
! scope="row" | MotoGP 3
| PlayStation 2
| 
| Namco
| Co-published with Namco in PAL only
| 
|-
! scope="row" | My Street
| PlayStation 2
| 
| Idol Minds
| North America and PAL only
| 
|-
! scope="row" | NCAA Final Four 2004
| PlayStation 2
| 
| 989 Sports
| North America only
| 
|-
! scope="row" | Pac-Man World 2
| PlayStation 2
| 
| Namco
| Co-published with Namco in PAL only
| 
|-
! scope="row" | Primal
| PlayStation 2
| 
| Cambridge Studio
| 
| 
|-
! scope="row" | Ratchet & Clank: Going Commando
| PlayStation 2
| 
| Insomniac Games
| 
| 
|-
! scope="row" | Shibai Michi
| PlayStation 2
| 
| 
| Japan only
| 
|-
! scope="row" | Shinobi
| PlayStation 2
| 
| Sega
| Co-published with Sega in PAL only
| 
|-
! scope="row" | SOCOM II U.S. Navy SEALs
| PlayStation 2
| 
| Zipper Interactive
| 
| 
|-
! scope="row" | Space Channel 5: Part 2
| PlayStation 2
| 
| United Game Artists
| Co-published with Sega in PAL only, except UK
| 
|-
! scope="row" | This is Football 2004
| PlayStation 2
| 
| London Studio
| PAL and North America only
| 
|-
! scope="row" | Time Crisis 3
| PlayStation 2
| 
| Nextech
| Co-published with Namco in PAL only
| 
|-
! scope="row" | War of the Monsters
| PlayStation 2
| 
| Incognito Entertainment
| 
| 
|-
! scope="row" | WRC 3
| PlayStation 2
| 
| Evolution Studios
| 
| 
|-

! scope="row" | Arc the Lad: End of Darkness
| PlayStation 2
| 
| Cattle CallJapan Studio
| Japan only
| 
|-
! scope="row" | Ape Escape: Pumped & Primed
| PlayStation 2
| 
| Japan Studio
| 
| 
|-
! scope="row" | Athens 2004
| PlayStation 2
| 
| Eurocom
| 
| 
|-
! scope="row" | ATV Offroad Fury 3
| PlayStation 2
| 
| Climax Studios (Climax Racing)
| North America only
| 
|-
! scope="row" | Bakufuu Slash! Kizna Arashi
| PlayStation 2
| 
| 
| Japan only
| 
|-
! scope="row" | Champions of Norrath: Realms of EverQuest
| PlayStation 2
| 
| Snowblind Studios
| Published by Sony Online Entertainment in North America only
| 
|-
! scope="row" | Crisis Zone
| PlayStation 2
| 
| Tose
| Co-published with Namco in PAL only
| 
|-
! scope="row" | Destruction Derby: Arenas
| PlayStation 2
| 
| Studio 33
| 
| 
|-
! scope="row" | DJbox
| PlayStation 2
| 
| 
| Japan only
| 
|-
! scope="row" | DJ: Decks & FX
| PlayStation 2
| 
| 
| PAL only
| 
|-
! scope="row" | Doko Demo Issho: Toro to Nagare Boshi
| PlayStation 2
| 
| 
| Japan only
| 
|-
! scope="row" | Everybody's Golf 4
| PlayStation 2
| 
| Clap HanzJapan Studio
| 
| 
|-
! scope="row" | EyeToy: Antigrav
| PlayStation 2
| 
| Harmonix
| North America and PAL only
| 
|-
! scope="row" | EyeToy: Monkey Mania
| PlayStation 2
| 
| Japan Studio
| Japan and PAL only
| 
|-
! scope="row" | EyeToy: Play 2
| PlayStation 2
| 
| London Studio
| North America and PAL only
| 
|-
! scope="row" | Final Fantasy XI
| PlayStation 2
| 
| Squaresoft
| Co-published with Square-Enix in North America only
| 
|-
! scope="row" | Finny the Fish & the Seven Waters
| PlayStation 2
| 
| Japan Studio
| Japan only
| 
|-
! scope="row" | Formula One 04
| PlayStation 2
| 
| Studio Liverpool
| 
| 
|-
! scope="row" | Gran Turismo 4: Prologue
| PlayStation 2
| 
| Polyphony Digital
| 
| 
|-
! scope="row" | Gretzky NHL 2005
| PlayStation 2
| 
| Page 44 Studios
| North America only
| 
|-
! scope="row" | I-Ninja
| PlayStation 2
| 
| Argonaut Games
| Co-published with Namco in PAL only
| 
|-
! scope="row" | Jackie Chan Adventures
| PlayStation 2
| 
| Atomic Planet Entertainment
| PAL only
| 
|-
! scope="row" | Jak 3
| PlayStation 2
| 
| Naughty Dog
| 
| 
|-
! scope="row" | Jet Li: Rise to Honor
| PlayStation 2
| 
| San Mateo Studio
| 
| 
|-
! scope="row" | Kill.Switch
| PlayStation 2
| 
| Namco
| Co-published with Namco in PAL only
| 
|-
! scope="row" | Killzone
| PlayStation 2
| 
| Guerrilla Games
| 
| 
|-
! scope="row" | Koufuku Sousakan
| PlayStation 2
| 
| 
| Japan only
| 
|-
! scope="row" | Popolocrois:Adventure of the Law of the Moon
| PlayStation 2
| 
| Epics 
| Japan only
| 
|-
! scope="row" | Pride of the Dragon Peace
| PlayStation 2
| 
| Japan Studio
| Japan only
| 
|-
! scope="row" | Prince of Persia: The Sands of Time
| PlayStation 2
| 
| Ubisoft Montreal
| Co-published with Ubisoft in Japan only
| 
|-
! scope="row" | Ratchet & Clank: Up Your Arsenal
| PlayStation 2
| 
| Insomniac Games
| 
| 
|-
! scope="row" | SingStar
| PlayStation 2
| 
| London Studio
| PAL only
| 
|-
! scope="row" | SingStar Party
| PlayStation 2
| 
| London Studio

| PAL only
| 
|-
! scope="row" | Siren
| PlayStation 2
| 
| Japan Studio (Team Gravity)
| 
| 
|-
! scope="row" | Sly 2: Band of Thieves
| PlayStation 2
| 
| Sucker Punch Productions
| 
| 
|-
! scope="row" | Smash Court Tennis Pro Tournament 2
| PlayStation 2
| 
| Now Production
| Co-published with Namco in PAL only
| 
|-
! scope="row" | Soulcalibur III
| PlayStation 2
| 
| Namco (Project Soul)
| Co-published with Namco in PAL only
| 
|-
! scope="row" | Syphon Filter: The Omega Strain
| PlayStation 2
| 
| Bend Studio
| 
| 
|-
! scope="row" | The Getaway: Black Monday
| PlayStation 2
| 
| London Studio
| 
| 
|-
! scope="row" | This is Football 2004
| PlayStation 2
| 
| London Studio
| PAL and North America only
| 
|-
! scope="row" | This is Football 2005
| PlayStation 2
| 
| London Studio
| PAL and North America only
| 
|-
! scope="row" | Vib-Ripple
| PlayStation 2
| 
| NanaOn-ShaJapan Studio
| Japan only
| 
|-
! scope="row" | WRC 4
| PlayStation 2
| 
| Evolution Studios
| 
| 
|-

! scope="row" | Ace Combat:Squadron Leader
| PlayStation 2
| 
| Namco
| Co-published with Namco in PAL only
| 
|-
! scope="row" | Ape Escape 3
| PlayStation 2
| 
| Japan Studio
| 
| 
|-
! scope="row" | Bokura no Kazoku
| PlayStation 2
| 
| 
| Japan only
| 
|-
! scope="row" | Brave: The Search for Spirit Dancer
| PlayStation 2
| 
| VIS Entertainment
| Co-published with VIS Entertainment in PAL only
| 
|-
! scope="row" | Buzz!: The Music Quiz
| PlayStation 2
| 
| Relentless Software
| 
| 
|-
! scope="row" | Champions: Return to Arms
| PlayStation 2
| 
| Snowblind Studios
| Published by Sony Online Entertainment in North America only
| 
|-
! scope="row" | Death by Degrees
| PlayStation 2
| 
| Namco
| Co-published with Namco in PAL only
| 
|-
! scope="row" | Peter Pan: Adventures in Never Land
| PlayStation 2
| 
| Doki Denki
| Co-published with Disney Interactive in PAL only
| 
|-
! scope="row" | EyeToy: Chat
| PlayStation 2
| 
| London Studio
| PAL only
| 
|-
! scope="row" | EyeToy: EduKids
| PlayStation 2
| 
| Arisu Media
| Asia only
| 
|-
! scope="row" | EyeToy: Kinetic
| PlayStation 2
| 
| London Studio
| North America and PAL only
| 
|-
! scope="row" | EyeToy: Play 3
| PlayStation 2
| 
| London Studio
| PAL only
| 
|-
! scope="row" | Formula One 05
| PlayStation 2
| 
| Studio Liverpool
| 
| 
|-
! scope="row" | Gaelic Games: Football
| PlayStation 2
| 
| IR Gurus
| PAL only
| 
|-
! scope="row" | Genji: Dawn of the Samurai
| PlayStation 2
| 
| Game Republic
| 
| 
|-
! scope="row" | God of War
| PlayStation 2
| 
| Santa Monica Studio
| North America and PAL only
| 
|-
! scope="row" | Gran Turismo 4
| PlayStation 2
| 
| Polyphony Digital
| 
| 
|-
! scope="row" | Gretzky NHL 2006
| PlayStation 2
| 
| Page 44 Studios
| North America only
| 
|-
! scope="row" | Jak X: Combat Racing
| PlayStation 2
| 
| Naughty Dog
| North America and PAL only
| 
|-
! scope="row" | Kenran Butou Sai: The Mars Daybreak
| PlayStation 2
| 
| 
| Japan only
| 
|-
! scope="row" | Mawaza
| PlayStation 2
| 
| Media.VisionJapan Studio
| Japan only
| 
|-
! scope="row" | MLB 2006
| PlayStation 2
| 
| 989 Sports
| Published in North America only
| 
|-
! scope="row" | MLB 2006
| PlayStation Portable
| 
| 989 Sports
| Published in North America only
| 
|-
! scope="row" | MotoGP 4
| PlayStation 2
| 
| Namco
| Co-published with Namco in PAL only
| 
|-
! scope="row" | NBA 06
| PlayStation 2, PlayStation Portable
| 
| San Diego Studio
| North America only
| 
|-
! scope="row" | Neopets: The Darkest Faerie
| PlayStation 2
| 
| Idol Minds
| North America only
| 
|-
! scope="row" | Ratchet: Deadlocked
| PlayStation 2
| 
| Insomniac Games
| 
| 
|-
! scope="row" | Rise of the Kasai
| PlayStation 2
| 
| BottleRocket Entertainment
| North America only
| 
|-
! scope="row" | Roland Garros Paris 2005:Powered by Smash Court Tennis
| PlayStation 2
| 
| Now Production
| Co-published with Namco in PAL only
| 
|-
! scope="row" | Shadow of the Colossus
| PlayStation 2
| 
| Japan Studio (Team Ico)
| 
| 
|-
! scope="row" | SingStar '80s
| PlayStation 2
| 
| London Studio
| 
| 
|-
! scope="row" | SingStar Pop
| PlayStation 2
| 
| London Studio
| 
| 
|-
! scope="row" | SingStar The Dome
| PlayStation 2
| 
| London Studio
| PAL only
| 
|-
! scope="row" | Sly 3: Honor Among Thieves
| PlayStation 2
| 
| Sucker Punch Productions
| 
| 
|-
! scope="row" | SOCOM 3 U.S. Navy SEALs
| PlayStation 2
| 
| Zipper Interactive
| 
| 
|-
! scope="row" | SpyToy
| PlayStation 2
| 
| London Studio
| North America and PAL only
| 
|-
! scope="row" | Stuart Little 3: Big Photo Mode Adventure
| PlayStation 2
| 
| 
| PAL only
| 
|-
! scope="row" | Tekken 5
| PlayStation 2
| 
| Namco
| Co-published with Namco in PAL only
| 
|-
! scope="row" | Wild Arms 4
| PlayStation 2
| 
| Media.VisionJapan Studio
| Japan only
| 
|-
! scope="row" | Wild Arms Alter Code: F
| PlayStation 2
| 
| Media.VisionJapan Studio
| Japan only
| 
|-
! scope="row" | WRC: Rally Evolved
| PlayStation 2
| 
| Evolution Studios
| PAL only
| 
|-
! scope="row" | Xenosaga Episode II: Jenseits von Gut und böse
| PlayStation 2
| 
| Monolith Soft
| Co-published with Namco in PAL only
| 
|-

! scope="row" | 24: The Game
| PlayStation 2
| 
| Cambridge Studio
| PAL only
| 
|-
! scope="row" | Ace Combat Zero: The Belkan War
| PlayStation 2
| 
| Namco
| Co-published with Bandai Namco Games in PAL only
| 
|-
! scope="row" | Ape Escape: Million Monkeys
| PlayStation 2
| 
| Japan Studio
| Japan only
| 
|-
! scope="row" | ATV Offroad Fury 4
| PlayStation 2
| 
| Climax Studios (Climax Racing)
| 
| 
|-
! scope="row" | B-Boy
| PlayStation 2, PlayStation Portable
| 
| FreeStyleGames
| PAL only
| 
|-
! scope="row" | Blood+ Souyoku no Battle Rondo
| PlayStation 2
| 
| Japan Studio
| Japan only
| 
|-
! scope="row" | Brave Story: Wataru no Bouken
| PlayStation 2, PlayStation Portable
| 
| Game Republic
| Japan only
| 
|-
! scope="row" | Buzz!: The Big Quiz
| PlayStation 2
| 
| Relentless Software
| 
| 
|-
! scope="row" | Buzz!: The Sports Quiz
| PlayStation 2
| 
| Kuju Entertainment
| PAL only
| 
|-
! scope="row" | Buzz! Junior: Jungle Party
| PlayStation 2
| 
| Magenta Software
| 
| 
|-
! scope="row" | EyeToy: Kinetic Combat
| PlayStation 2
| 
| London Studio
| PAL only
| 
|-
! scope="row" | EyeToy: Play Sports
| PlayStation 2
| 
| London Studio
| PAL only
| 
|-
! scope="row" | Forbidden Siren 2
| PlayStation 2
| 
| Japan Studio (Team Gravity)
| Japan and PAL only
| 
|-
! scope="row" | Formula One 06
| PlayStation 2, PlayStation Portable
| 
| Studio Liverpool
| 
| 
|-
! scope="row" | Gran Turismo 4 Online test version
| PlayStation 2
| 
| Polyphony Digital
| Japan only
| 
|-
! scope="row" | Gunparade Orchestra: Ao no Shou
| PlayStation 2
| 
| Alfa System
| Japan only
| 
|-
! scope="row" | Gunparade Orchestra: Midori no Shou
| PlayStation 2
| 
| Alfa System
| Japan only
| 
|-
! scope="row" | Gunparade Orchestra: Shiro no Shou
| PlayStation 2
| 
| Alfa System
| Japan only
| 
|-
! scope="row" | Lemmings
| PlayStation 2, PlayStation 3, PlayStation Portable
| 
| Team17Rusty Nutz
| PAL only
| 
|-
! scope="row" | MLB 06: The Show
| PlayStation 2, PlayStation Portable
| 
| San Diego Studio
| North America and Korea only
| 
|-
! scope="row" | NBA 07
| PlayStation 2, PlayStation 3, PlayStation Portable
| 
| San Diego Studio
| North America only
| 
|-
! scope="row" | Rule of Rose
| PlayStation 2
| 
| PunchlineJapan Studio
| Japan only
| 
|-
! scope="row" | Shinobido: Way of the Ninja
| PlayStation 2
| 
| Acquire
| PAL only
| 
|-
! scope="row" | SingStar Anthems
| PlayStation 2
| 
| London Studio
| PAL only
| 
|-
! scope="row" | SingStar Legends
| PlayStation 2
| 
| London Studio
| 
| 
|-
! scope="row" | SingStar Rocks!
| PlayStation 2
| 
| London Studio
| 
| 
|-
! scope="row" | SOCOM U.S. Navy SEALs: Combined Assault
| PlayStation 2
| 
| Zipper Interactive
| 
| 
|-
! scope="row" | Tourist Trophy
| PlayStation 2
| 
| Polyphony Digital
| 
| 
|-
! scope="row" | Urban Reign
| PlayStation 2
| 
| Namco
| Co-published with Namco in PAL only
| 
|-
! scope="row" | Wild Arms 5
| PlayStation 2
| 
| Media.VisionJapan Studio
| Japan only
| 
|-
! scope="row" | Alundra
| PlayStation 3
| 
| Matrix SoftwareJapan Studio
| Japan only
| 
|-
! scope="row" | Buzz!: The Hollywood Quiz
| PlayStation 2
| 
| Relentless Software
| 
| 
|-
! scope="row" | Buzz! The Mega Quiz
| PlayStation 2
| 
| Relentless Software
| 
| 
|-
! scope="row" | Buzz! Junior: Monster Rumble
| PlayStation 2
| 
| FreeStyleGamesMagenta Software
| 
| 
|-
! scope="row" | Buzz! Junior: Robo Jam
| PlayStation 2
| 
| FreeStyleGamesMagenta Software
| 
| 
|-
! scope="row" | Everybody's Tennis
| PlayStation 2
| 
| Clap HanzJapan Studio
| 
| 
|-
! scope="row" | EyeToy Astro Zoo
| PlayStation 2
| 
| London Studio
| PAL only
| 
|-
! scope="row" | Gaelic Games: Football 2
| PlayStation 2
| 
| Transmission Games
| PAL only
| 
|-
! scope="row" | Gaelic Games: Hurling
| PlayStation 2
| 
| Transmission Games
| PAL only
| 
|-
! scope="row" | God of War II
| PlayStation 2
| 
| Santa Monica Studio
| North America and PAL only
| 
|-
! scope="row" | MLB 07: The Show
| PlayStation 2, PlayStation 3, PlayStation Portable
| 
| San Diego Studio
| North America and Korea only
| 
|-
! scope="row" | NBA 08
| PlayStation 2, PlayStation 3, PlayStation Portable
| 
| San Diego Studio
| North America and Australia only
| 
|-
! scope="row" | Rogue Galaxy
| PlayStation 2
| 
| Level-5Japan Studio
| 
| 
|-
! scope="row" | SingStar '90s
| PlayStation 2
| 
| London Studio
| 
| 
|-
! scope="row" | SingStar Amped
| PlayStation 2
| 
| London Studio
| North America and Australia only
| 
|-
! scope="row" | SingStar Pop Hits 2
| PlayStation 2
| 
| London Studio
| PAL only
| 
|-
! scope="row" | SingStar Rock Ballads
| PlayStation 2
| 
| London Studio
| PAL only
| 
|-
! scope="row" | SingStar R&B
| PlayStation 2
| 
| London Studio
| PAL only
| 
|-
! scope="row" | Syphon Filter: Dark Mirror
| PlayStation 2
| 
| Bend Studio
| 
| 
|-

! scope="row" | Buzz!: The Pop Quiz
| PlayStation 2
| 
| Relentless Software
| 
| 
|-
! scope="row" | Buzz!: The Schools Quiz
| PlayStation 2
| 
| Relentless Software
| 
| 
|-
! scope="row" | Buzz! Junior: Ace Racers
| PlayStation 2
| 
| Cohort Studios
| PAL only
| 
|-
! scope="row" | Buzz! Junior: Dino Den
| PlayStation 2
| 
| Cohort Studios
| PAL only
| 
|-
! scope="row" | EyeToy Play: Hero
| PlayStation 2
| 
| London Studio
| PAL only
| 
|-
! scope="row" | EyeToy Play: PomPom Party
| PlayStation 2
| 
| London Studio
| PAL only
| 
|-
! scope="row" | MLB 08: The Show
| PlayStation 2, PlayStation 3, PlayStation Portable
| 
| San Diego Studio
| North America only
| 
|-
! scope="row" | NBA 09: The Inside
| PlayStation 2, PlayStation 3, PlayStation Portable
| 
| San Diego Studio
| North America only
| 
|-
! scope="row" | Ratchet & Clank: Size Matters
| PlayStation 2
| 
| High Impact Games
| 
| 
|-
! scope="row" | SingStar ABBA
| PlayStation 2, PlayStation 3
| 
| London Studio
| 
| 
|-
! scope="row" | SingStar BoyBands vs GirlBands
| PlayStation 2
| 
| London Studio
| 
| 
|-
! scope="row" | SingStar Country
| PlayStation 2
| 
| London Studio
| North America only
| 
|-
! scope="row" | SingStar Hottest Hits
| PlayStation 2
| 
| London Studio
| Australia only
| 
|-
! scope="row" | SingStar Party Hits
| PlayStation 2
| 
| London Studio
| Australia only
| 
|-
! scope="row" | SingStar Pop Vol. 2
| PlayStation 2
| 
| London Studio
| North America only
| 
|-
! scope="row" | SingStar Singalong with Disney
| PlayStation 2
| 
| London Studio
| PAL only
| 
|-
! scope="row" | SingStar Summer Party
| PlayStation 2
| 
| London Studio
| PAL only
| 
|-
! scope="row" | Twisted Metal: Head-On: Extra Twisted Edition
| PlayStation 2
| 
| Eat Sleep Play
| North America only
| 
|-

! scope="row" | Buzz!: Brain of the World
| PlayStation 2, PlayStation 3, PlayStation Portable
| 
| Relentless Software
| PAL only
| 
|-
! scope="row" | Cart Kings
| PlayStation 2
| 
| 
| India only
| 
|-
! scope="row" | Chandragupta: Warrior Prince
| PlayStation 2
| 
| 
| India only
| 
|-
! scope="row" | Desi Adda: Games of India
| PlayStation 2
| 
| Gameshastra
| India only
| 
|-
! scope="row" | Ghostbusters: The Video Game
| PlayStation 2, PlayStation 3
| 
| Terminal Reality (PS3)Grove Street Games (PS2)
| PAL only
| 
|-
! scope="row" | Hanuman: Boy Warrior
| PlayStation 2
| 
| 
| India only
| 
|-
! scope="row" | Jak and Daxter: The Lost Frontier
| PlayStation 2, PlayStation Portable
| 
| High Impact Games
| North America and PAL only
| 
|-
! scope="row" | MLB 09: The Show
| PlayStation 2, PlayStation 3, PlayStation Portable
| 
| San Diego Studio
| North America only
| 
|-
! scope="row" | MotorStorm: Arctic Edge
| PlayStation 2
| 
| Virtuos
| 
| 
|-
! scope="row" | MotorStorm: Arctic Edge
| PlayStation Portable
| 
| Bigbig Studios
| 
| 
|-
! scope="row" | Secret Agent Clank
| PlayStation 2
| 
| Sanzaru Games
| North America and PAL only
| 
|-
! scope="row" | SingStar Latino
| PlayStation 2
| 
| London Studio
| North America only
| 
|-
! scope="row" | SingStar Motown
| PlayStation 2
| 
| London Studio
| 
| 
|-
! scope="row" | SingStar Queen
| PlayStation 2
| 
| London Studio
| 
| 
|-
! scope="row" | SingStar Take That
| PlayStation 2
| 
| London Studio
| UK only
| 
|-
! scope="row" | SingStar Vasco
| PlayStation 2
| 
| London Studio
| Italy only
| 
|-
! scope="row" | Wipeout Pulse
| PlayStation 2
| 
| Studio Liverpool
| PAL only
| 
|-

! scope="row" | MLB 10: The Show
| PlayStation 2, PlayStation 3, PlayStation Portable
| 
| San Diego Studio
| North America and Korea only
| 
|-
! scope="row" | SingStar Chart Hits
| PlayStation 2
| 
| London Studio
| Australia Only
| 
|-
! scope="row" | SingStar Wiggles
| PlayStation 2
| 
| London Studio
| Australia only
| 
|-
! scope="row" | Street Cricket Champions
| PlayStation 2
| 
| Trine Games
| India only
| 
|-
! scope="row" | Syphon Filter: Logan's Shadow
| PlayStation 2
| 
| Bend Studio
| North America only
| 
|-

! scope="row" | Chandragupta: Warrior Prince
| PlayStation 2
| 
| 
| India only
| 
|-
! scope="row" | MLB 11: The Show
| PlayStation 2, PlayStation 3, PlayStation Portable
| 
| San Diego Studio
| North America and Korea only
| 
|-
! scope="row" | RA. ONE: The Game
| PlayStation 2
| 
| Red Chillies Entertainment
| India only
| 
|-

! scope="row" | Street Cricket Champions 2
| PlayStation 2
| 
| Trine Games
| India only
| 
|-

! scope="row" | Don 2: The Game
| PlayStation 2, PlayStation Portable
| 
| GameshastraMango Games
| India only
| 
|-

! scope="row" | Genji: Days of the Blade
| PlayStation 3
| 
| Game Republic
| 
| 
|-
! scope="row" | Resistance: Fall of Man
| PlayStation 3
| 
| Insomniac Games
| 
| 
|-
! scope="row" | Untold Legends: Dark Kingdom
| PlayStation 3
| 
| Sony Online Entertainment
| Published by Sony Online Entertainment
|
|-
! scope="row" | Blast Factor
| PlayStation 3
| 
| Bluepoint Games
| 
| 
|-
! scope="row" | Cash Guns Chaos DLX
| PlayStation 3
| 
| Sony Online Entertainment
| Published by Sony Online Entertainment in North America only
| 
|-
! scope="row" | Go! Sudoku
| PlayStation 3
| 
| Sumo Digital
| 
| 
|-
! scope="row" | Gran Turismo HD Concept
| PlayStation 3
| 
| Polyphony Digital
| 
| 
|-
! scope="row" | Mainichi Issho
| PlayStation 3
| 
| Game Arts
| Japan only
| 
|-
! scope="row" | 2Xtreme'
| PlayStation 3
| 
| 989 Sports
| North America only
| 
|-
! scope="row" | Boku no Natsuyasumi 3: Kitaguni Hen: Chiisana Boku no Dai Sougen| PlayStation 3
| 
| Millennium Kitchen
| Japan only
| 
|-
! scope="row" | Folklore| PlayStation 3
| 
| Game Republic
| 
| 
|-
! scope="row" | Formula One Championship Edition| PlayStation 3
| 
| Studio Liverpool
| 
| 
|-
! scope="row" | Heavenly Sword| PlayStation 3
| 
| Ninja Theory
| 
| 
|-
! scope="row" | Lair| PlayStation 3
| 
| Factor 5
| 
| 
|-
! scope="row" | MotorStorm| PlayStation 3
| 
| Evolution Studios
| 
| 
|-
! scope="row" | Ratchet & Clank Future: Tools of Destruction| PlayStation 3
| 
| Insomniac Games
| 
| 
|-
! scope="row" | Ridge Racer 7| PlayStation 3
| 
| Bandai Namco Studios
| Co-published with Namco in PAL only
| 
|-
! scope="row" | SingStar| PlayStation 3
| 
| London Studio
| 
| 
|-
! scope="row" | The Eye of Judgment| PlayStation 3
| 
| Japan Studio
| 
| 
|-
! scope="row" | Uncharted: Drake's Fortune| PlayStation 3
| 
| Naughty Dog
| 
| 
|-
! scope="row" | Warhawk| PlayStation 3
| 
| Incognito Entertainment
| 
| 
|-
! scope="row" | Aqua Vita| PlayStation 3
| 
| 
| North America and PAL only
| 
|-
! scope="row" | Bealphareth| PlayStation 3
| 
| Zealsoft
| Japan only
| 
|-
! scope="row" | Calling All Cars!| PlayStation 3
| 
| Incognito Entertainment
| 
| 
|-
! scope="row" | Cool Boarders| PlayStation 3
| 
| UEP Systems
| North America and PAL only
| 
|-
! scope="row" | Crash Bandicoot| PlayStation 3
| 
| Naughty Dog
| 
| 
|-
! scope="row" | Crime Crackers| PlayStation 3
| 
| Media.VisionJapan Studio
| Japan only
| 
|-
! scope="row" | Crime Crackers 2| PlayStation 3
| 
| Media.VisionJapan Studio
| Japan only
| 
|-
! scope="row" | Depth| PlayStation 3
| 
| Opus
| Japan only
| 
|-
! scope="row" | Destruction Derby| PlayStation 3
| 
| Reflections Interactive
| 
| 
|-
! scope="row" | Everybody's Golf 2| PlayStation 3
| 
| Clap HanzJapan Studio
| 
| 
|-
! scope="row" | Everyday Shooter| PlayStation 3
| 
| Queasy Games
| 
| 
|-
! scope="row" | Panekit| PlayStation 3
| 
| 
| Japan only
| 
|-
! scope="row" | Feel Ski| PlayStation 3
| 
| Yuke's
| 
| 
|-
! scope="row" | Flow| PlayStation 3
| 
| Thatgamecompany
| 
| 
|-
! scope="row" | Ganbare Morikawa Kimi 2nd Pet in TV| PlayStation 3
| 
| MuuMuu
| Japan only
| 
|-
! scope="row" | Global Force - Shin Sentō Kokka| PlayStation 3
| 
| 
| Japan only
| 
|-
! scope="row" | Go! Puzzle| PlayStation 3, PlayStaion Portable
| 
| ZoonamiCohort Studios
| 
| 
|-
! scope="row" | Rapid Reload| PlayStation 3
| 
| Media.VisionJapan Studio
| Japan only
| 
|-
! scope="row" | High Stakes on the Vegas Strip: Poker Edition| PlayStation 3
| 
| Coresoft
| Published by Sony Online Entertainment in North America and PAL only
| 
|-
! scope="row" | High Velocity Bowling| PlayStation 3
| 
| San Diego Studio
| 
| 
|-
! scope="row" | I.Q.: Intelligent Qube| PlayStation 3
| 
| Epics
| Japan only
| 
|-
! scope="row" | Jumping Flash!| PlayStation 3
| 
| ExactUltra
| 
| 
|-
! scope="row" | LocoRoco Cocoreccho!| PlayStation 3
| 
| Japan Studio
| 
| 
|-
! scope="row" | MediEvil| PlayStation 3
| 
| Cambridge Studio
| 
| 
|-
! scope="row" | Mesmerize Distort| PlayStation 3
| 
| London StudioPlaylogic
| North America and PAL only
| 
|-
! scope="row" | Mesmerize Trace| PlayStation 3
| 
| London StudioPlaylogic
| North America and PAL only
| 
|-
! scope="row" | Nucleus| PlayStation 3
| 
| Kuju Entertainment
| 
| 
|-
! scope="row" | Operation Creature Feature| PlayStation 3
| 
| London StudioPlaylogic
| (North America and PAL only)
| 
|-
! scope="row" | Ore no Ryōri| PlayStation 3
| 
| 
| Japan only
| 
|-
! scope="row" | Ore no Shikabane o Koete Yuke| PlayStation 3
| 
| 
| Japan only
| 
|-
! scope="row" | Pain| PlayStation 3
| 
| Idol MindsSan Diego Studio
| Retail version in PAL only
| 
|-
! scope="row" | Philosoma| PlayStation 3
| 
| Epics
| Japan only
| 
|-
! scope="row" | PixelJunk Racers| PlayStation 3
| 
| Q-Games
| North America and PAL only
| 
|-
! scope="row" | Piyotama| PlayStation 3, PlayStation Portable
| 
| Japan Studio
| 
| 
|-
! scope="row" | PoPoLoCrois Monogatari| PlayStation 3
| 
| Epics
| Japan only
| 
|-
! scope="row" | PoPoLoCrois Monogatari II| PlayStation 3
| 
| Epics
| Japan only
| 
|-
! scope="row" | PoPoLoGue| PlayStation 3
| 
| 
| Japan only
| 
|-
! scope="row" | Robbit mon Dieu| PlayStation 3
| 
| 
| Japan only
| 
|-
! scope="row" | Ape Escape| PlayStation 3
| 
| Japan Studio
| Japan only
| 
|-
! scope="row" | Snakeball| PlayStation 3
| 
| Gamoola SoftRavn Studio
| 
| 
|-
! scope="row" | Super Rub 'a' Dub| PlayStation 3
| 
| Sumo Digital
| 
| 
|-
! scope="row" | Super Stardust HD| PlayStation 3
| 
| Housemarque
| 
| 
|-
! scope="row" | Syphon Filter| PlayStation 3
| 
| Bend Studio
| (North America and PAL only)
| 
|-
! scope="row" | Tekken 5: Dark Resurrection| PlayStation 3
| 
| Namco
| Co-published with Namco Bandai Games in PAL only
| 
|-
! scope="row" | The Trials of Topoq| PlayStation 3
| 
| London Studio
| 
| 
|-
! scope="row" | Tiny Bullets| PlayStation 3
| 
| 
| Japan only
| 
|-
! scope="row" | TomaRunner| PlayStation 3
| 
| 
| Japan only
| 
|-
! scope="row" | Tori-Emaki| PlayStation 3
| 
| London Studio
| 
| 
|-
! scope="row" | Toy Home| PlayStation 3
| 
| Game Republic
| 
| 
|-
! scope="row" | Twisted Metal 2| PlayStation 3
| 
| SingleTrac
| North America and Japan only
| 
|-
! scope="row" | Velldeselba Senki: Tsubasa no Kunshō| PlayStation 3
| 
| 
| Japan only
| 
|-
! scope="row" | Wipeout| PlayStation 3
| 
| Psygnosis
| 
| 
|-
! scope="row" | XI sai| PlayStation 3
| 
| 
| Japan only
| 
|-
! scope="row" | XI Jumbo| PlayStation 3
| 
| 
| Japan only
| 
|-

! scope="row" | Afrika| PlayStation 3
| 
| Rhino Studios
| Japan only
| 
|-
! scope="row" | Aquanaut's Holiday: Hidden Memories| PlayStation 3
| 
| Artdink
| Japan only
| 
|-
! scope="row" | Buzz!: Quiz TV| PlayStation 3
| 
| Relentless Software
| 
| 
|-
! scope="row" | Gran Turismo 5 Prologue| PlayStation 3
| 
| Polyphony Digital
| 
| 
|-
! scope="row" | Everybody's Golf 5| PlayStation 3
| 
| Clap HanzJapan Studio
| 
| 
|-
! scope="row" | LittleBigPlanet| PlayStation 3
| 
| Media Molecule
| 
| 
|-
! scope="row" | MotorStorm: Pacific Rift| PlayStation 3
| 
| Evolution Studios
| 
| 
|-
! scope="row" | Resistance 2| PlayStation 3
| 
| Insomniac Games
| 
| 
|-
! scope="row" | SingStar Vol. 2| PlayStation 3
| 
| London Studio
| 
| 
|-
! scope="row" | SingStar Vol. 3| PlayStation 3
| 
| London Studio
| 
| 
|-
! scope="row" | SOCOM U.S. Navy SEALs: Confrontation| PlayStation 3
| 
| Slant Six Games
| 
| 
|-
! scope="row" | Time Crisis 4| PlayStation 3
| 
| Nex Entertainment
| Co-published with Namco in PAL only
| 
|-

! scope="row" | Addie no Okurimono: To Moze from Addie| PlayStation 3
| 
| 
| Japan only
| 
|-
! scope="row" | Buzz! Junior: Jungle Party| PlayStation 3
| 
| Cohort Studios
| PAL and North America only
| 
|-
! scope="row" | Crash Bandicoot 2: Cortex Strikes Back| PlayStation 3
| 
| Naughty Dog
| 
| 
|-
! scope="row" | Crash Bandicoot Carnival| PlayStation 3
| 
| Eurocom
| Japan only
| 
|-
! scope="row" | Crash Bandicoot: Warped| PlayStation 3
| 
| Naughty Dog
| 
| 
|-
! scope="row" | Crash Commando| PlayStation 3
| 
| Creative Vault Studios
| 
| 
|-
! scope="row" | Dark Mist| PlayStation 3
| 
| Game Republic
| 
| 
|-
! scope="row" | Dig-a-Dig Pukka| PlayStation 3
| 
| 
| Japan only
| 
|-
! scope="row" | Docchi Mecha!| PlayStation 3
| 
| 
| Japan only
| 
|-
! scope="row" | Echochrome| PlayStation 3
| 
| Japan Studio
| 
| 
|-
! scope="row" | Elefunk| PlayStation 3
| 
| 8bit Games
| 
| 
|-
! scope="row" | Jet Moto| PlayStation 3
| 
| SingleTrac
| 
| 
|-
! scope="row" | Jet Moto 2| PlayStation 3
| 
| SingleTrac
| North America and PAL only
| 
|-
! scope="row" | Jet Moto 3| PlayStation 3
| 
| Locomotive Games
| North America only
| 
|-
! scope="row" | Linda³ Again| PlayStation 3
| 
| 
| Japan only
| 
|-
! scope="row" | Linger in Shadows| PlayStation 3
| 
| Plastic
| 
| 
|-
! scope="row" | Magical Dice Kids| PlayStation 3
| 
| Japan Studio
| Japan only
| 
|-
! scope="row" | PixelJunk Eden| PlayStation 3
| 
| Q-Games
| North America and PAL only
| 
|-
! scope="row" | PixelJunk Monsters| PlayStation 3
| 
| Q-Games
| North America and PAL only
| 
|-
! scope="row" | PlayStation Home| PlayStation 3
| 
| London Studio
| 
| 
|-
! scope="row" | Ratchet & Clank Future: Quest for Booty| PlayStation 3
| 
| Insomniac Games
| Retail version in PAL only
| 
|-
! scope="row" | Siren: Blood Curse| PlayStation 3
| 
| Japan Studio (Team Gravity)
| Retail version in PAL only
| 
|-
! scope="row" | Sky Diving| PlayStation 3
| 
| Lightweight
| 
| 
|-
! scope="row" | Syphon Filter 3| PlayStation 3
| 
| Bend Studio
| North America and PAL only
| 
|-
! scope="row" | The Last Guy| PlayStation 3
| 
| Japan Studio
| 
| 
|-
! scope="row" | Wipeout HD| PlayStation 3
| 
| Studio Liverpool
| 
| 
|-
! scope="row" | Buzz!: Quiz World| PlayStation 3
| 
| Relentless Software
| 
| 
|-
! scope="row" | Demon's Souls| PlayStation 3
| 
| FromSoftwareJapan Studio
| Japan only
| 
|-
! scope="row" | EyePet| PlayStation 3
| 
| London Studio
| PAL only
| 
|-
! scope="row" | God of War Collection| PlayStation 3
| 
| Bluepoint Games
| North America and PAL only
| 
|-
! scope="row" | Infamous| PlayStation 3
| 
| Sucker Punch Productions
| 
| 
|-
! scope="row" | Killzone 2| PlayStation 3
| 
| Guerrilla Games
| 
| 
|-
! scope="row" | Ratchet & Clank Future: A Crack in Time| PlayStation 3
| 
| Insomniac Games
| 
| 
|-
! scope="row" | SingStar Latino| PlayStation 3
| 
| London Studio
| North America only
| 
|-
! scope="row" | SingStar Motown| PlayStation 3
| 
| London Studio
| PAL only
| 
|-
! scope="row" | SingStar Queen| PlayStation 3
| 
| London Studio
| 
| 
|-
! scope="row" | SingStar Pop Edition| PlayStation 3
| 
| London Studio
| PAL only
| 
|-
! scope="row" | SingStar Starter Pack| PlayStation 3
| 
| London Studio
| PAL only
| 
|-
! scope="row" | SingStar Take That| PlayStation 3
| 
| London Studio
| UK only
| 
|-
! scope="row" | SingStar Vasco| PlayStation 3
| 
| London Studio
| Italy only
| 
|-
! scope="row" | Toro to Morimori| PlayStation 3
| 
| 
| Japan only
| 
|-
! scope="row" | Uncharted 2: Among Thieves| PlayStation 3
| 
| Naughty Dog
| 
| 
|-
! scope="row" | Wipeout HD Fury| PlayStation 3
| 
| Studio Liverpool
| PAL only
| 
|-
! scope="row" | .detuned| PlayStation 3
| 
| Farbrausch
| 
| 
|-
! scope="row" | Bejeweled 2| PlayStation 3
| 
| PopCap Games
| Published by Sony Online Entertainment in North America and PAL only
| 
|-
! scope="row" | Buzz! Junior: Dino Den| PlayStation 3
| 
| Cohort Studios
| PAL only
| 
|-
! scope="row" | Buzz! Junior: Monster Rumble| PlayStation 3
| 
| Cohort Studios
| PAL and North America only
| 
|-
! scope="row" | Buzz! Junior: Robo Jam| PlayStation 3
| 
| Cohort Studios
| PAL and North America only
| 
|-
! scope="row" | Cool Boarders 2| PlayStation 3
| 
| Idol Minds
| North America and PAL only
| 
|-
! scope="row" | Cool Boarders 3| PlayStation 3
| 
| Idol Minds
| North America only
| 
|-
! scope="row" | Dress| PlayStation 3
| 
| 
| Japan only
| 
|-
! scope="row" | Fat Princess| PlayStation 3
| 
| Titan Studios
| 
| 
|-
! scope="row" | Flower| PlayStation 3
| 
| Thatgamecompany
| 
| 
|-
! scope="row" | G-Police| PlayStation 3
| 
| Psygnosis
| Japan and PAL only
| 
|-
! scope="row" | Gravity Crash| PlayStation 3
| 
| Just Add Water
| 
| 
|-
! scope="row" | GTI Club+: Rally Côte d'Azur| PlayStation 3
| 
| Sumo Digital
| North America only
| 
|-
! scope="row" | Heavy Weapon| PlayStation 3
| 
| PopCap Games
| Published by Sony Online Entertainment in North America and PAL only
| 
|-
! scope="row" | Hustle Kings| PlayStation 3
| 
| VooFoo Studios
| 
| 
|-
! scope="row" | Jumping Flash! 2| PlayStation 3
| 
| ExactMuuMuu
| North America and Japan only
| 
|-
! scope="row" | Kula World| PlayStation 3
| 
| Game Design Sweden AB
| Japan and PAL only
| 
|-
! scope="row" | Magic Orbz| PlayStation 3
| 
| Creat Studios
| North America only
| 
|-
! scope="row" | Numblast| PlayStation 3
| 
| Japan Studio
| 
| 
|-
! scope="row" | Peggle| PlayStation 3
| 
| PopCap Games
| Published by Sony Online Entertainment in North America and PAL only
| 
|-
! scope="row" | Peggle Nights| PlayStation 3
| 
| PopCap Games
| Published by Sony Online Entertainment in North America and PAL only
| 
|-
! scope="row" | PixelJunk Shooter| PlayStation 3
| 
| Q-Games
| North America and PAL only
| 
|-
! scope="row" | Rag Doll Kung Fu: Fists of Plastic| PlayStation 3
| 
| Tarsier Studios
| 
| 
|-
! scope="row" | Rapid Racer| PlayStation 3
| 
| Team Soho
| Japan only
| 
|-
! scope="row" | Revenge of the Wounded Dragons| PlayStation 3
| 
| Behaviour Interactive (Behaviour Santiago)
| North America only
| 
|-
! scope="row" | Savage Moon| PlayStation 3
| 
| FluffyLogic
| 
| 
|-
! scope="row" | Switchball| PlayStation 3
| 
| Atomic Elbow
| Published by Sony Online Entertainment in North America and PAL only
| 
|-
! scope="row" | Syphon Filter 2| PlayStation 3
| 
| Bend Studio
| North America and PAL only
| 
|-
! scope="row" | The Punisher: No Mercy| PlayStation 3
| 
| Zen Studios
| 
| 
|-
! scope="row" | Trash Panic| PlayStation 3
| 
| Japan Studio
| 
| 
|-
! scope="row" | Wild Arms 2| PlayStation 3
| 
| Media.VisionJapan Studio
| North America and Japan only
| 
|-
! scope="row" | Zuma| PlayStation 3
| 
| PopCap Games
| Published by Sony Online Entertainment in North America and PAL only
| 
|-

! scope="row" | Beat Sketcher| PlayStation 3
| 
| 
| 
| 
|-
! scope="row" | Buzz!: The Ultimate Music Quiz| PlayStation 3
| 
| Relentless Software
| PAL only
| 
|-
! scope="row" | EyePet Move Edition| PlayStation 3
| 
| London Studio
| 
| 
|-
! scope="row" | God of War III| PlayStation 3
| 
| Santa Monica Studio
| 
| 
|-
! scope="row" | Gran Turismo 5| PlayStation 3
| 
| Polyphony Digital
| 
| 
|-
! scope="row" | Heavy Rain| PlayStation 3
| 
| Quantic Dream
| 
| 
|-
! scope="row" | Heavy Rain Move Edition| PlayStation 3
| 
| Quantic Dream
| 
| 
|-
! scope="row" | High Velocity Bowling Move Edition| PlayStation 3
| 
| San Diego Studio
| North America and Japan only
| 
|-
! scope="row" | Kung Fu Rider| PlayStation 3
| 
| Japan Studio
| 
| 
|-
! scope="row" | Mag| PlayStation 3
| 
| Zipper Interactive
| 
| 
|-
! scope="row" | ModNation Racers| PlayStation 3
| 
| United Front Games
| 
| 
|-
! scope="row" | SingStar Chart Hits| PlayStation 3
| 
| London Studio
| Australia only
| 
|-
! scope="row" | SingStar Dance| PlayStation 3
| 
| London Studio
| 
| 
|-
! scope="row" | SingStar Guitar| PlayStation 3
| 
| London Studio
| PAL only
| 
|-
! scope="row" | The Sly Collection| PlayStation 3
| 
| Sanzaru Games
| 
| 
|-
! scope="row" | Sports Champions| PlayStation 3
| 
| Zindagi GamesSan Diego Studio
| 
| 
|-
! scope="row" | Start the Party!| PlayStation 3
| 
| Supermassive Games
| 
| 
|-
! scope="row" | The Fight: Lights Out| PlayStation 3
| 
| ColdWood Interactive
| 
| 
|-
! scope="row" | The Shoot| PlayStation 3
| 
| Cohort Studios
| 
| 
|-
! scope="row" | Time Crisis: Razing Storm| PlayStation 3
| 
| Nex Entertainment
| Co-published with Bandai Namco Entertainment in PAL only
| 
|-
! scope="row" | TV Superstars| PlayStation 3
| 
| Cambridge Studio
| 
| 
|-
! scope="row" | White Knight Chronicles| PlayStation 3
| 
| Level-5Japan Studio
| 
| 
|-

! scope="row" | 40 Winks| PlayStation 3
| 
| Eurocom
| PAL only
| 
|-
! scope="row" | Arc Arena: Monster Tournament| PlayStation 3
| 
| ARC Entertainment
| North America and Japan only
| 
|-
! scope="row" | Arc the Lad| PlayStation 3
| 
| G-Craft
| North America and Japan only
| 
|-
! scope="row" | Arc the Lad II| PlayStation 3
| 
| ARC Entertainment
| North America and Japan only
| 
|-
! scope="row" | Buzz!: Quiz Player| PlayStation 3
| 
| Relentless Software
| PAL only, free-to-play version
| 
|-
! scope="row" | Crash Team Racing| PlayStation 3
| 
| Naughty Dog
| 
| 
|-
! scope="row" | Critical Depth| PlayStation 3
| 
| SingleTrac
| PAL only
| 
|-
! scope="row" | Dead Nation| PlayStation 3
| 
| Housemarque
| 
| 
|-
! scope="row" | Eat Them!| PlayStation 3
| 
| FluffyLogic
| 
| 
|-
! scope="row" | echochrome ii| PlayStation 3
| 
| Japan Studio
| 
| 
|-
! scope="row" | Feeding Frenzy 2: Shipwreck Showdown| PlayStation 3
| 
| PopCap Games
| Published by Sony Online Entertainment in North America and PAL only
| 
|-
! scope="row" | Gunparade March| PlayStation 3
| 
| Alfa System
| Japan only
| 
|-
! scope="row" | Kurushi Final| PlayStation 3
| 
| Epics
| PAL only
| 
|-
! scope="row" | MotorStorm 3D Rift| PlayStation 3
| 
| Evolution Studios
| 
| 
|-
! scope="row" | PixelJunk Racers: 2nd Lap| PlayStation 3
| 
| Q-Games
| North America and PAL only
| 
|-
! scope="row" | Qlione Evolve| PlayStation 3
| 
| Sony Online Entertainment
| Published by Sony Online Entertainment in North America and PAL only
| 
|-
! scope="row" | Sackboy's Prehistoric Moves| PlayStation 3
| 
| Supermassive GamesXDev
| 
| 
|-
! scope="row" | SingStar Viewer| PlayStation 3
| 
| London Studio
| 
| 
|-
! scope="row" | Swords & Soldiers| PlayStation 3
| 
| Ronimo Games
| Published by Sony Online Entertainment in North America and PAL only
| 
|-
! scope="row" | TerRover| PlayStation 3
| 
| 
| Published by Sony Online Entertainment in North America and PAL only
| 
|-
! scope="row" | Top Darts| PlayStation 3
| 
| Devil's Details
| 
| 
|-
! scope="row" | Tumble| PlayStation 3
| 
| 
| 
| 
|-
! scope="row" | Bleach: Soul Resurrecciòn| PlayStation 3
| 
| Japan StudioRacjin
| Japan only
| 
|-
! scope="row" | Carnival Island| PlayStation 3
| 
| Magic Pixel Games
| 
| 
|-
! scope="row" | Everybody Dance| PlayStation 3
| 
| London Studio
| PAL and North America only
| 
|-
! scope="row" | EyePet & Friends| PlayStation 3
| 
| London Studio
| 
| 
|-
! scope="row" | God of War: Origins Collection| PlayStation 3
| 
| Ready at Dawn
| 
| 
|-
! scope="row" | Infamous 2| PlayStation 3
| 
| Sucker Punch Productions
| 
| 
|-
! scope="row" | Killzone 3| PlayStation 3
| 
| Guerrilla Games
| 
| 
|-
! scope="row" | LittleBigPlanet 2| PlayStation 3
| 
| Media Molecule
| 
| 
|-
! scope="row" | Medieval Moves: Deadmund's Quest| PlayStation 3
| 
| Zindagi GamesSan Diego Studio
| 
| 
|-
! scope="row" | MotorStorm: Apocalypse| PlayStation 3
| 
| Evolution Studios
| PAL and North America only
| 
|-
! scope="row" | Move Fitness| PlayStation 3
| 
| 
| Retail version in PAL, Asia and Korea, only download in North America
| 
|-
! scope="row" | PlayStation Move Ape Escape| PlayStation 3
| 
| Japan Studio
| Retail version in Japan, Asia and PAL, only download in North America and UK
| 
|-
! scope="row" | PlayStation Move Heroes| PlayStation 3
| 
| nStigate Games
| 
| 
|-
! scope="row" | Ratchet & Clank: All 4 One| PlayStation 3
| 
| Insomniac Games
| 
| 
|-
! scope="row" | Resistance 3| PlayStation 3
| 
| Insomniac Games
| 
| 
|-
! scope="row" | SingStar Back to the '80s| PlayStation 3
| 
| London Studio
| PAL only
| 
|-
! scope="row" | SOCOM 4| PlayStation 3
| 
| Zipper Interactive
| 
| 
|-
! scope="row" | Start the Party! Save the World| PlayStation 3
| 
| Supermassive Games
| Retail version in PAL and Asia only 
| 
|-
! scope="row" | Tekken Hybrid| PlayStation 3
| 
| Bandai Namco Studios
| Co-published with Namco Bandai Games in PAL only
| 
|-
! scope="row" | The Ico & Shadow of the Colossus Collection| PlayStation 3
| 
| Bluepoint GamesJapan Studio (Team Ico)
| 
| 
|-
! scope="row" | Uncharted 3: Drake's Deception| PlayStation 3
| 
| Naughty Dog
| 
| 
|-
! scope="row" | White Knight Chronicles II| PlayStation 3
| 
| Level-5Japan Studio
| 
| 
|-
! scope="row" | Acceleration of Suguri X Edition| PlayStation 3
| 
| Orange Juice
| Published by Sony Online Entertainment
| 
|-
! scope="row" | Akimi Village| PlayStation 3
| 
| NinjaBee
| Published by Sony Online Entertainment in North America and PAL only
| 
|-
! scope="row" | Arc the Lad III| PlayStation 3
| 
| ARC Entertainment
| North America and Japan only
| 
|-
! scope="row" | DC Universe Online| PlayStation 3
| 
| Sony Online Entertainment
| Published by Sony Online Entertainment
| 
|-
! scope="row" | Fire Panic| PlayStation 3
| 
| 
| Japan only
| 
|-
! scope="row" | Free Realms| PlayStation 3
| 
| Sony Online Entertainment
| Published by Sony Online Entertainment in North and PAL only
| 
|-
! scope="row" | Infamous: Festival of Blood| PlayStation 3
| 
| Sucker Punch Productions
| 
| 
|-
! scope="row" | Motor Toon Grand Prix| PlayStation 3
| 
| Polyphony Digital
| 
| 
|-
! scope="row" | Nightmare Creatures| PlayStation 3
| 
| Kalisto Entertainment
| Japan only
| 
|-
! scope="row" | Payday: The Heist| PlayStation 3
| 
| Overkill Software
| Published by Sony Online Entertainment in North America and PAL only
| 
|-
! scope="row" | PixelJunk Shooter 2| PlayStation 3
| 
| Q-Games
| North America and PAL only
| 
|-
! scope="row" | PixelJunk SideScroller| PlayStation 3
| 
| Q-Games
| North America and PAL only
| 
|-
! scope="row" | Plants vs. Zombies| PlayStation 3
| 
| PopCap Games
| Published by Sony Online Entertainment in North America and PAL only
| 
|-
! scope="row" | Rally Cross| PlayStation 3
| 
| 989 Studios
| Japan and PAL only
| 
|-
! scope="row" | RA. ONE: The Game| PlayStation 3
| 
| Red Chillies Entertainment
| PAL only, retail version in India only
| 
|-
! scope="row" | Rochard| PlayStation 3
| 
| Recoil Games
| Published by Sony Online Entertainment in North America and PAL only
| 
|-
! scope="row" | Sideway New York| PlayStation 3
| 
| Playbrains
| Published by Sony Online Entertainment in North America and PAL only
| 
|-
! scope="row" | Slam Bolt Scrappers| PlayStation 3
| 
| Fire Hose Games
| Published by Sony Online Entertainment in North America and PAL only
| 
|-
! scope="row" | Everybody Dance 2| PlayStation 3
| 
| London Studio
| PAL only
|
|-
! scope="row" | God of War Saga| PlayStation 3
| 
| Santa Monica StudioReady at DawnBluepoint Games
| North America only
| 
|-
! scope="row" | Jak and Daxter Collection| PlayStation 3
| 
| Mass Media Games
| 
| 
|-
! scope="row" | Journey Collector's Edition| PlayStation 3
| 
| Thatgamecompany
| 
| 
|-
! scope="row" | Killzone Trilogy| PlayStation 3
| 
| Guerrilla Games
| 
| 
|-
! scope="row" | LittleBigPlanet Karting| PlayStation 3
| 
| United Front GamesSan Diego Studio
| 
| 
|-
! scope="row" | MLB 12: The Show| PlayStation 3, PlayStation Vita
| 
| San Diego Studio
| North America, Korea and Australia only
| 
|-
! scope="row" | PlayStation All-Stars Battle Royale| PlayStation 3
| 
| SuperBot Entertainment (PS3)Bluepoint Games (PS Vita)
| 
| 
|-
! scope="row" | Ratchet & Clank Collection| PlayStation 3
| 
| Idol Minds
| 
| 
|-
! scope="row" | Ratchet & Clank: Full Frontal Assault| PlayStation 3
| 
| Insomniac Games
| 
| 
|-
! scope="row" | Sorcery| PlayStation 3
| 
| The Workshop  Santa Monica Studio
| 
| 
|-
! scope="row" | Sports Champions 2| PlayStation 3
| 
| Zindagi GamesSan Diego Studio
| 
| 
|-
! scope="row" | Starhawk| PlayStation 3
| 
| LightBox Interactive
| 
| 
|-
! scope="row" | Twisted Metal| PlayStation 3
| 
| Eat Sleep Play
| 
| 
|-
! scope="row" | Wonderbook: Book of Spells| PlayStation 3
| 
| London Studio
| PAL and North America only
| 
|-

! scope="row" | Dark Cloud| PlayStation 3
| 
| Level-5Japan Studio
| Japan only
| 
|-
! scope="row" | Datura| PlayStation 3
| 
| Plastic
| 
| 
|-
! scope="row" | Gacharoku| PlayStation 3
| 
| Agenda
| Japan only
| 
|-
! scope="row" | Journey| PlayStation 3
| 
| Thatgamecompany
| 
| 
|-
! scope="row" | Killzone| PlayStation 3
| 
| Supermassive Games
| Remastered version
| 
|-
! scope="row" | Malicious| PlayStation 3
| 
| Alvion
| 
| 
|-
! scope="row" | MotorStorm RC| PlayStation 3, PlayStation Vita
| 
| Evolution Studios
| 
| 
|-
! scope="row" | Move Street Cricket| PlayStation 3
| 
| Trine Games
| PAL only, retail version in India only
| 
|-
! scope="row" | PixelJunk 4am| PlayStation 3
| 
| Q-Games
| North America and PAL only
| 
|-
! scope="row" | Primal| PlayStation 3
| 
| Cambridge Studio
| North America only
| 
|-
! scope="row" | Sound Shapes| PlayStation 3
| 
| Queasy Games
| 
| 
|-
! scope="row" | Spyro the Dragon| PlayStation 3
| 
| Insomniac Games
| 
| 
|-
! scope="row" | Spyro 2: Ripto's Rage!| PlayStation 3
| 
| Insomniac Games
| 
| 
|-
! scope="row" | Spyro: Year of the Dragon| PlayStation 3
| 
| Insomniac Games
| North America and PAL only
| 
|-
! scope="row" | Suzuki TT Superbikes Real Road Racing Championship| PlayStation 3
| 
| Jester Interactive
| North America only
| 
|-
! scope="row" | Syphon Filter: The Omega Strain| PlayStation 3
| 
| Bend Studio
| North America only
| 
|-
! scope="row" | The Legend of Dragoon| PlayStation 3
| 
| Japan Studio
| North America and Japan only
| 
|-
! scope="row" | The Unfinished Swan| PlayStation 3
| 
| Giant SparrowSanta Monica Studio
| 
| 
|-
! scope="row" | Tokyo Jungle| PlayStation 3
| 
| Crispy's!Japan Studio
| Retail version in Japan only
| 
|-
! scope="row" | UmJammer Lammy| PlayStation 3
| 
| NanaOn-Sha
| 
| 
|-
! scope="row" | When Vikings Attack!| PlayStation 3, PlayStation Vita
| 
| Clever Beans
| 
| 
|-
! scope="row" | War of the Monsters| PlayStation 3
| 
| Incognito Entertainment
| North America only
| 
|-
! scope="row" | Warhawk| PlayStation 3
| 
| SingleTrac
| 
| 
|-
! scope="row" | Wild Arms| PlayStation 3
| 
| Media.VisionJapan Studio
| 
| 
|-

! scope="row" | Beyond: Two Souls| PlayStation 3
| 
| Quantic Dream
| 
| 
|-
! scope="row" | God of War: Ascension| PlayStation 3
| 
| Santa Monica Studio
| 
| 
|-
! scope="row" | Invizimals: The Lost Kingdom| PlayStation 3
| 
| NovaramaMagenta Software
| Retail version in PAL only, download only in North America
| 
|-
! scope="row" | Knack's Quest| iOS/Android
| 
| Japan Studio
| Published under PlayStation Mobile
| 
|-
! scope="row" | MLB 13: The Show| PlayStation 3, PlayStation Vita
| 
| San Diego Studio
| Retail version in North America, Korea and Australia, download only in PAL
| 
|-
! scope="row" | Puppeteer| PlayStation 3
| 
| Japan Studio
| 
| 
|-
! scope="row" | Ratchet & Clank: Into the Nexus| PlayStation 3
| 
| Insomniac Games
| 
| 
|-
! scope="row" | Sly Cooper: Thieves in Time| PlayStation 3
| 
| Sanzaru Games
| 
| 
|-
! scope="row" | Sly Cooper: Thieves in Time| PlayStation Vita
| 
| Sanzaru Games
| 
| 
|-
! scope="row" | The Last of Us| PlayStation 3
| 
| Naughty Dog
| 
| 
|-
! scope="row" | Wonderbook: Book of Potions| PlayStation 3
| 
| London Studio
| PAL and North America only
| 
|-
! scope="row" | Wonderbook: Diggs Nightcrawler| PlayStation 3
| 
| London Studio
| PAL and North America only
| 
|-
! scope="row" | Wonderbook: Walking with Dinosaurs| PlayStation 3
| 
| Supermassive Games
| PAL and North America only
| 
|-

! scope="row" | Bentley's Hackpack| PlayStation 3, PlayStation Vita
| 
| Sanzaru Games
| 
| 
|-
! scope="row" | Everybody Dance Digital| PlayStation 3
| 
| London Studio
| PAL only, free-to-play version
| 
|-
! scope="row" | Dare to Fly| PlayStation 3
| 
| 
| PAL only
| 
|-
! scope="row" | Dust 514| PlayStation 3
| 
| CCP Games
| 
| 
|-
! scope="row" | Everybody's Golf 6| PlayStation 3
| 
| Clap HanzJapan Studio
| Retail version in Japan only
| 
|-
! scope="row" | Finny the Fish & the Seven Waters| PlayStation 3
| 
| 
| Japan only
| 
|-
! scope="row" | Kite Fight| PlayStation 3
| 
| 
| PAL only
| 
|-
! scope="row" | Move Street Cricket II| PlayStation 3
| 
| 
| PAL only, retail version in India only
| 
|-
! scope="row" | Pro Foosball| PlayStation 3
| 
| 
| 
| 
|-
! scope="row" | PS Vita Pets: Puppy Parlour| iOS/Android
| 
| 
| Published under PlayStation Mobile
| 
|-
! scope="row" | Rain| PlayStation 3
| 
| AcquireJapan Studio
| Retail version in Japan only
| 
|-
! scope="row" | Ratchet: Deadlocked| PlayStation 3
| 
| Idol Minds
| Remastered version
| 
|-
! scope="row" | Ratchet & Clank: Before the Nexus| iOS/Android
| 
| Darkside Game Studios
| Published under PlayStation Mobile
| 
|-
! scope="row" | Rebel Raiders: Operation Nighthawk| PlayStation 3
| 
| 
| North America only
| 
|-
! scope="row" | Riding Star| PlayStation 3
| 
| 
| North America only
| 
|-
! scope="row" | Siren| PlayStation 3
| 
| Japan Studio (Team Gravity)
| North America and Japan only
| 
|-
! scope="row" | Space Fishermen| PlayStation 3
| 
| 
| Japan only
| 
|-
! scope="row" | The Mark of Kri| PlayStation 3
| 
| San Diego Studio
| North America only
| 
|-
! scope="row" | The Red Star| PlayStation 3
| 
| 
| North America only
| 
|-
! scope="row" | Twisted Metal| PlayStation 3
| 
| SingleTrac
| North America and PAL only
| 
|-
! scope="row" | Twisted Metal: Black| PlayStation 3
| 
| Incognito Entertainment
| North America and PAL only
| 
|-
! scope="row" | Ultimate Board Game Collection| PlayStation 3
| 
| 
| North America only
| 
|-

! scope="row" | DC Universe Online| PlayStation 4
| 
| Sony Online Entertainment
| Published by Sony Online Entertainment
| 
|-
! scope="row" | Flower| PlayStation Vita, PlayStation 4
| 
| Bluepoint Games
| 
| 
|-
! scope="row" | Killzone: Shadow Fall| PlayStation 4
| 
| Guerrilla Games
| 
| 
|-
! scope="row" |  Knack| PlayStation 4
| 
| Japan Studio
| 
| 
|-
! scope="row" | Resogun| PlayStation 4
| 
| Housemarque
| 
| 
|-
! scope="row" | Sound Shapes| PlayStation 4
| 
| Queasy Games
| 
| 
|-
! scope="row" | The Playroom| PlayStation 4
| 
| Team Asobi
| 
| 
|-
! scope="row" | Tearaway| PlayStation Vita
| 
| Media Molecule
| 
| 
|-
! scope="row" | Escape Plan| PlayStation 4
| 
| Fun Bits
| 
| 
|-
! scope="row" | Doki-Doki Universe| PlayStation 3, PlayStation Vita, PlayStation 4
| 
| HumaNature Studios
| 
| 
|-
! scope="row" | Doko Demo Issho| PlayStation Portable, PlayStation 3, PlayStation Vita
| 
| 
|  PSN   PS One Classic  Japan only
| 
|-
! scope="row" | Doko Demo Issho Tsuika Disc: Koneko Mo Issyo| PlayStation Portable, PlayStation 3, PlayStation Vita
| 
| 
|  PSN   PS One Classic  Japan only
| 
|-
! scope="row" | Gran Turismo 6| PlayStation 3
| 
| Polyphony Digital
| 
| 
|-
! scope="row" | No Heroes Allowed: No Puzzles Either!| PlayStation Vita
| 
| Acquire
| 
| 
|-
! scope="row" | Flow| PlayStation Vita, PlayStation 4
| 
| SuperVillain Studios
| 
| 
|-
! scope="row" | Minecraft| PlayStation 3
| 
| Mojang4J Studios
| 
| 
|-

! scope="row" | Dead Nation: Apocalypse Edition| PlayStation 4
| 
| Climax Studios
|  PSN 
| 
|-
! scope="row" | Soul Sacrifice Delta| PlayStation Vita
| 
| Marvelous AQLJapan Studio
| Retail version in Japan and Hong Kong only
| 
|-
! scope="row" | Destiny of Spirits| PlayStation Vita
| 
| 
|  PSN 
| 
|-
! scope="row" | Infamous Second Son| PlayStation 4
| 
| Sucker Punch Productions
| 
| 
|-
! scope="row" | MLB 14: The Show| PlayStation 3, PlayStation Vita, PlayStation 4
| 
| San Diego Studio
| Retail version in North America, download only in PAL
| 
|-
! scope="row" | Dead Nation| PlayStation Vita
| 
| Climax Studios
|  PSN 
| 
|-
! scope="row" | God of War Collection| PlayStation Vita
| 
| Sanzaru Games
| 
| 
|-
! scope="row" | Borderlands 2| PlayStation Vita
| 
| Gearbox Software
| 
| 
|-
! scope="row" | Lemmings Touch| PlayStation Vita
| 
| 
|  PSN 
| 
|-
! scope="row" | The Sly Collection| PlayStation Vita
| 
| Sanzaru Games
| 
| 
|-
! scope="row" | PlayStation Vita Pets| PlayStation Vita
| 
| 
| Retail version in PAL, download only in North America
| 
|-
! scope="row" | Entwined| PlayStation 4
| 
| Pixelopus
|  PSN 
| 
|-
! scope="row" | Ratchet & Clank: Ginga Saikyo Tristar Pack| PlayStation 3
| 
| 
| Japan only
| 
|-
! scope="row" | Brightis| PlayStation Portable, PlayStation 3, PlayStation Vita
| 
| Quintet
|  PSN   PS One Classic  Japan only
| 
|-
! scope="row" | Freedom Wars| PlayStation Vita
| 
| Japan StudioShiftDimps
| 
| 
|-
! scope="row" | Oreshika: Tainted Bloodlines| PlayStation Vita
| 
| 
| Retail version in Japan and Hong Kong only
| 
|-
! scope="row" | Entwined| PlayStation 3, PlayStation Vita
| 
| Pixelopus
|  PSN 
| 
|-
! scope="row" | Ratchet & Clank Collection| PlayStation Vita
| 
| Mass Media Games
| Retail version in PAL, download only in North America
| 
|-
! scope="row" | The Last of Us Remastered| PlayStation 4
| 
| Naughty Dog
| 
| 
|-
! scope="row" | Killzone: Shadow Fall Intercept| PlayStation 4
| 
| Guerrilla Games
|  PSN 
| 
|-
! scope="row" | Pocket MūMū| PlayStation Portable, PlayStation 3, PlayStation Vita
| 
| 
|  PSN   PS One Classic  Japan only
| 
|-
! scope="row" | Hohokum| PlayStation 3, PlayStation Vita, PlayStation 4
| 
| Honeyslug
|  PSN 
| 
|-
! scope="row" | CounterSpy| PlayStation 3, PlayStation 4, PlayStation Vita
| 
| Dynamighty
|  PSN 
| 
|-
! scope="row" | Rogue Galaxy| PlayStation 3
| 
| Level-5Japan Studio
|  PSN   PS2 Classic  Japan only
| 
|-
! scope="row" | Infamous First Light| PlayStation 4
| 
| Sucker Punch Productions
| Retail version in PAL, download only in North America
| 
|-
! scope="row" | Destiny| PlayStation 3, PlayStation 4
| 
| Bungie
| Published by Sony Computer Entertainment in Japan only
| 
|-
! scope="row" | Murasaki Baby| PlayStation Vita
| 
| 
|  PSN 
| 
|-
! scope="row" | Arc the Lad: Twilight of the Spirits| PlayStation 3
| 
| Cattle CallJapan Studio
|  PSN   PS2 Classic  Japan only
| 
|-
! scope="row" | Driveclub| PlayStation 4
| 
| Evolution Studios
| 
| 
|-
! scope="row" | Vib-Ribbon| PlayStation Portable, PlayStation 3, PlayStation Vita
| 
| NanaOn-Sha
|  PSN   PS One Classic 
| 
|-
! scope="row" | Minecraft| PlayStation Vita
| 
| Mojang4J Studios
| Retail version in PAL, download code only in North America
| 
|-
! scope="row" | Wild Arms 5| PlayStation 3
| 
| Media.VisionJapan Studio
|  PSN   PS2 Classic  Japan only
| 
|-
! scope="row" | The Unfinished Swan| PlayStation Vita, PlayStation 4
| 
| Giant SparrowSanta Monica Studio
|  PSN 
| 
|-
! scope="row" | SingStar| PlayStation 4
| 
| London Studio
|  PSN 
| 
|-
! scope="row" | SingStar: Ultimate Party| PlayStation 3, PlayStation 4
| 
| London Studio
| PAL only
| 
|-
! scope="row" | Run Sackboy! Run!| iOS
| 
| Firesprite
| Published under PlayStation Mobile
| 
|-
! scope="row" | The Hungry Horde| PlayStation Vita
| 
| 
|  PSN 
| 
|-
! scope="row" | The Muppets Movie Adventures| PlayStation Vita
| 
| Virtual Toys
| Retail version in PAL, download only in North America
| 
|-
! scope="row" | LittleBigPlanet 3 
| PlayStation 3, PlayStation 4
| 
| Sumo Digital
| 
| 
|-
! scope="row" | LittleBigPlanet PS Vita: Marvel Super Hero Edition| PlayStation Vita
| 
| 
| Retail version in PAL, download only in North America
| 
|-
! scope="row" | Ape Escape 3| PlayStation 3
| 
| Japan Studio
|  PSN   PS2 Classic  Japan only
| 
|-
! scope="row" | Pocket Jiman| PlayStation Portable, PlayStation 3, PlayStation Vita
| 
| 
|  PSN   PS One Classic  Japan only
| 
|-
! scope="row" | Resogun| PlayStation 3, PlayStation Vita
| 
| Housemarque
|  PSN 
| 
|-
! scope="row" | Run Sackboy! Run!| Android
| 
| Firesprite
| Published under PlayStation Mobile
| 
|-
! scope="row" | Soukou Kihei Armodyne| PlayStation 3
| 
| 
|  PSN   PS2 Classic  Japan only
| 
|-

! scope="row" | Fat Princess: Piece of Cake| PlayStation Vita, iOS/Android
| 
| 
| Published under PlayStation Mobile
| 
|-
! scope="row" | Dual Hearts| PlayStation 3
| 
| Matrix SoftwareJapan Studio
|  PSN   PS2 Classic  Japan only
| 
|-
! scope="row" | Sagashi ni Ikouyo| PlayStation 3
| 
| 
|  PSN   PS2 Classic  Japan only
| 
|-
! scope="row" | Super Stardust Ultra| PlayStation 4
| 
| Housemarque
|  PSN 
| 
|-
! scope="row" | Legaia 2: Duel Saga| PlayStation 3
| 
| 
|  PSN   PS2 Classic  Japan only
| 
|-
! scope="row" | The Order: 1886| PlayStation 4
| 
| Ready at Dawn
| 
| 
|-
! scope="row" | Helldivers| PlayStation 3, PlayStation Vita, PlayStation 4
| 
| Arrowhead Game Studios
|  PSN 
| 
|-
! scope="row" | Doko Demo Issho: Watashi Naehon| PlayStation 3
| 
| 
|  PSN   PS2 Classic  Japan only
| 
|-
! scope="row" | Bloodborne| PlayStation 4
| 
| FromSoftwareJapan Studio
| 
| 
|-
! scope="row" | MLB 15: The Show| PlayStation 3, PlayStation Vita, PlayStation 4
| 
| San Diego Studio
| Retail version in North America, download only in PAL
| 
|-
! scope="row" | Run Sackboy! Run!| PlayStation Vita
| 
| Firesprite
|  PSN 
| 
|-
! scope="row" | MonsterBag| PlayStation Vita
| 
| 
|  PSN 
| 
|-
! scope="row" | Ka 2: Let's Go Hawaii| PlayStation 3
| 
| 
|  PSN   PS2 Classic  Japan only
| 
|-
! scope="row" | Moe Chronicle| PlayStation Vita
| 
| 
| Asia only
| 
|-
! scope="row" | The Last of Us: Left Behind| PlayStation 3, PlayStation 4
| 
| Naughty Dog
|  PSN 
| 
|-
! scope="row" | Mad Maestro!| PlayStation 3
| 
| 
|  PSN   PS2 Classic  Japan only
| 
|-
! scope="row" | Ultra Street Fighter IV| PlayStation 4
| 
| Capcom
|  PSN  Published by Sony Computer Entertainment outside Japan
| 
|-
! scope="row" | Looney Tunes Galactic Sports!| PlayStation Vita
| 
| Virtual Toys
| PAL released, North America release later this year digitally
| 
|-
! scope="row" | Hustle Kings| PlayStation 4
| 
| VooFoo Studios
|  PSN 
| 
|-
! scope="row" | God of War III Remastered| PlayStation 4
| 
| Wholesale Algorithms
| 
| 
|-
! scope="row" | Journey| PlayStation 4
| 
| Tricky Pixels
|  PSN 
| 
|-
! scope="row" | Everybody's Gone to the Rapture| PlayStation 4
| 
| The Chinese Room
|  PSN 
| 
|-
! scope="row" | Until Dawn| PlayStation 4
| 
| Supermassive Games
| 
| 
|-
! scope="row" | Tearaway Unfolded| PlayStation 4
| 
| Media Molecule  Tarsier Studios 
| 
| 
|-
! scope="row" | Destiny: The Taken King| PlayStation 3, PlayStation 4
| 
| Bungie
| Published by Sony Computer Entertainment in Japan only
| 
|-
! scope="row" | Journey Collector's Edition| PlayStation 4
| 
| Tricky Pixels
| 
| 
|-
! scope="row" | Uncharted: The Nathan Drake Collection| PlayStation 4
| 
| Bluepoint Games
| 
| 
|-
! scope="row" | Driveclub Bikes| PlayStation 4
| 
| Evolution Studios
|  PSN 
| 
|-
! scope="row" | Phineas and Ferb: Day of Doofenshmirtz| PlayStation Vita
| 
| 
| Retail version in PAL, download only in North America
| 
|-
! scope="row" | Call of Duty: Black Ops III| PlayStation 3, PlayStation 4
| 
| Treyarch
| Published by Sony Computer Entertainment in Japan only
| 
|-
! scope="row" | Beyond: Two Souls| PlayStation 4
| 
| Quantic Dream
|  PSN 
| 
|-
! scope="row" | BigFest| PlayStation Vita
| 
| 
|  PSN 
| 
|-
! scope="row" | Dark Cloud| PlayStation 4
| 
| Level-5Japan Studio
|  PSN   PS2 Classic  North America and PAL only
| 
|-
! scope="row" | Fat Princess Adventures| PlayStation 4
| 
| Fun Bits
|  PSN 
| 
|-
! scope="row" | Guns Up!| PlayStation 4
| 
| Valkyrie EntertainmentSan Diego Studio
|  PSN 
| 
|-
! scope="row" | Rogue Galaxy| PlayStation 4
| 
| Level-5Japan Studio
|  PSN   PS2 Classic  North America and PAL only
| 
|-
! scope="row" | The Mark of Kri| PlayStation 4
| 
| San Diego Studio
|  PSN   PS2 Classic  North America and PAL only
| 
|-
! scope="row" | Twisted Metal: Black| PlayStation 4
| 
| Incognito Entertainment
|  PSN   PS2 Classic  North America and PAL only
| 
|-
! scope="row" | War of the Monsters| PlayStation 4
| 
| Incognito Entertainment
|  PSN   PS2 Classic  North America and PAL only
| 
|-
! scope="row" | Helldivers| Microsoft Windows
| 
| Arrowhead Game Studios
| 
| 
|-
! scope="row" | Gravity Rush Remastered 
| PlayStation 4
| 
| Bluepoint GamesJapan Studio (Team Gravity)
| 
| 
|-
! scope="row" | FantaVision| PlayStation 4
| 
| 
|  PSN   PS2 Classic  North America and PAL only
| 
|-
! scope="row" | PaRappa the Rapper 2| PlayStation 4
| 
| 
|  PSN   PS2 Classic  North America and PAL only
| 
|-

! scope="row" | Hardware: Rivals| PlayStation 4
| 
| 
|  PSN 
| 
|-
! scope="row" | Arc the Lad: Twilight of the Spirits| PlayStation 4
| 
| Cattle CallJapan Studio
|  PSN   PS2 Classic  North America and PAL only
| 
|-
! scope="row" | Dark Chronicle| PlayStation 4
| 
| Level-5Japan Studio
|  PSN   PS2 Classic  North America and PAL only
| 
|-
! scope="row" | Invizimals: Battle Hunters| iOS, Android
| 
| Novarama
| Published under PlayStation Mobile
| 
|-
! scope="row" | Heavy Rain| PlayStation 4
| 
| Quantic Dream
|  PSN 
| 
|-
! scope="row" | The Heavy Rain & Beyond: Two Souls Collection| PlayStation 4
| 
| Quantic Dream
| 
| 
|-
! scope="row" | Rise of the Kasai| PlayStation 4
| 
| BottleRocket Entertainment
|  PSN   PS2 Classic  North America and PAL only
| 
|-
! scope="row" | Okage: Shadow King| PlayStation 4
| 
| Zener Works
|  PSN   PS2 Classic  North America and PAL only
| 
|-
! scope="row" | MLB The Show 16| PlayStation 3, PlayStation 4
| 
| San Diego Studio
| 
| 
|-
! scope="row" | Ratchet & Clank| PlayStation 4
| 
| Insomniac Games
| 
|
|-
! scope="row" | Everybody's Gone to the Rapture| Microsoft Windows
| 
| The Chinese Room
| 
| 
|-
! scope="row" | Alienation| PlayStation 4
| 
| Housemarque
| Retail version in Asia only
| 
|-
! scope="row" | Uncharted: Fortune Hunter| iOS/Android
| 
| Playspree
| Published under PlayStation Mobile
| 
|-
! scope="row" | Uncharted 4: A Thief's End| PlayStation 4
| 
| Naughty Dog
| 
| 
|- 
! scope="row" | Kinetica| PlayStation 4
| 
| Santa Monica Studio
|  PSN   PS2 Classic  North America and PAL only
| 
|-
! scope="row" | Shadow of the Beast| PlayStation 4
| 
| 
| Retail version in Asia only
| 
|-
! scope="row" | Wild Arms 3| PlayStation 4
| 
| Media.VisionJapan Studio
|  PSN   PS2 Classic  North America and PAL only
| 
|-
! scope="row" | Primal| PlayStation 4
| 
| Cambridge Studio
|  PSN   PS2 Classic  North America and PAL only
| 
|-
! scope="row" | Siren| PlayStation 4
| 
| Japan Studio (Team Gravity)
|  PSN   PS2 Classic  North America and PAL only
| 
|-
! scope="row" | Kill Strain| PlayStation 4
| 
| San Diego Studio
|  PSN 
| 
|-
! scope="row" | Ape Escape 2| PlayStation 4
| 
| Japan Studio
|  PSN   PS2 Classic  North America and PAL only
| 
|-
! scope="row" | No Man's Sky| PlayStation 4
| 
| Hello Games
| Co-published with Hello Games in PAL only
| 
|-
! scope="row" | Bound| PlayStation 4
| 
| Plastic
|  PSN 
| 
|-
! scope="row" | Everybody's Tennis| PlayStation 4
| 
| Clap HanzJapan Studio
|  PSN   PS2 Classic  North America and PAL only
| 
|-
! scope="row" | Driveclub VR| PlayStation VR
| 
| Evolution Studios
| 
| 
|-
! scope="row" | Here They Lie| PlayStation 4
| 
| 
| Retail version in PAL, download only in North America
| 
|-
! scope="row" | Hustle Kings VR| PlayStation VR
| 
|  Creative Vault Studios
| Retail version in PAL, download only in North America
| 
|-
! scope="row" | PlayStation VR Worlds| PlayStation VR
| 
| London Studio
| 
| 
|-
! scope="row" | RIGS: Mechanized Combat League| PlayStation VR
| 
| Guerrilla Cambridge
| 
| 
|-
! scope="row" | Super Stardust Ultra VR| PlayStation VR
| 
| Housemarque
| Retail version in PAL, download only in North America
| 
|-
! scope="row" | The Playroom VR| PlayStation VR
| 
| Japan Studio (Team Asobi)
|  PSN 
| 
|-
! scope="row" | Tumble VR| PlayStation VR
| 
| Supermassive Games
|  PSN 
| 
|-
! scope="row" | Until Dawn: Rush of Blood| PlayStation VR
| 
| Supermassive Games
| 
| 
|-
! scope="row" | The Tomorrow Children| PlayStation 4
| 
| Q-Games
|  PSN 
| 
|-
! scope="row" | Call of Duty: Infinite Warfare| PlayStation 4
| 
| Infinity Ward
| Published by Sony Interactive Entertainment in Japan
| 
|-
! scope="row" | Call of Duty: Modern Warfare Remastered| PlayStation 4
| 
| Raven Software
| Published by Sony Interactive Entertainment in Japan
| 
|-
! scope="row" | Uncharted: Drake's Fortune Remastered| PlayStation 4
| 
| Bluepoint Games
| Retail version in PAL, download only in North America
| 
|-
! scope="row" | Uncharted 2: Among Thieves Remastered| PlayStation 4
| 
| Bluepoint Games
| Retail version in PAL, download only in North America
| 
|-
! scope="row" | Uncharted 3: Drake's Deception Remastered| PlayStation 4
| 
| Bluepoint Games
| Retail version in PAL, download only in North America
| 
|-
! scope="row" | The Last Guardian| PlayStation 4
| 
| Japan Studio (Team Ico)GenDesign
| 
| 
|-

! scope="row" | Gravity Rush 2| PlayStation 4
| 
| Japan Studio (Team Gravity)
| 
| 
|-
! scope="row" | Nioh 
| PlayStation 4
| 
| Team Ninja
| Published by Sony Interactive Entertainment outside Japan
| 
|-
! scope="row" | Malicious Fallen| PlayStation 4
| 
| Alvion
|  PSN  Published by Sony Interactive Entertainment outside Japan
| 
|-
! scope="row" | Horizon Zero Dawn| PlayStation 4
| 
| Guerrilla Games
| 
| 
|-
! scope="row" | MLB The Show 17| PlayStation 4
| 
| San Diego Studio
| 
| 
|-
! scope="row" | Drawn to Death| PlayStation 4
| 
| The Bartlet Jones Supernatural Detective AgencySan Diego Studio
|  PSN 
| 
|-
! scope="row" | PaRappa the Rapper Remastered| PlayStation 4
| 
| 
| Retail version in Asia, download only internationally
| 
|-
! scope="row" | StarBlood Arena| PlayStation VR
| 
| WhiteMoon DreamsSan Diego Studio
| 
| 
|-
! scope="row" | LocoRoco Remastered| PlayStation 4
| 
| Japan Studio
| Retail version in Asia, download only internationally
| 
|-
! scope="row" | Farpoint| PlayStation VR
| 
| Impulse Gear
| 
| 
|-
! scope="row" | Wipeout Omega Collection| PlayStation 4
| 
| XDevClever BeansCreative Vault Studios
| 
| 
|
|-
! scope="row" | Air Force Special Ops: Nightfall| PlayStation VR
| 
| Firesprite
|  PSN 
| 
|-
! scope="row" | Honkowa Presents: Nogizaka46 VR Horror House| PlayStation VR
| 
| 
|  PSN  Only available in Japan
|
|-
! scope="row" | That's You!| PlayStation 4
| 
| Wish Studios
| 
| 
|-
! scope="row" | Patapon Remastered| PlayStation 4
| 
| Japan StudioPyramid
| Retail version in Asia, download only internationally
| 
|-
! scope="row" | Crash Bandicoot N. Sane Trilogy| PlayStation 4
| 
| Vicarious Visions
| Published by Sony Interactive Entertainment in Japan only
| 
|-
! scope="row" | Matterfall| PlayStation 4
| 
| Housemarque
| Retail version in PAL, download only in North America
| 
|-
! scope="row" | Jak and Daxter: The Precursor Legacy| PlayStation 4
| 
| Naughty Dog
|  PSN   PS2 Classic 
| 
|-
! scope="row" | Uncharted: The Lost Legacy| PlayStation 4
| 
| Naughty Dog
| 
| 
|-
! scope="row" | Everybody's Golf| PlayStation 4
| 
| Clap HanzJapan Studio
| 
| 
|-
! scope="row" | Knack II| PlayStation 4
| 
| Japan Studio
| 
| 
|-
! scope="row" | Destiny 2| PlayStation 4
| 
| Bungie
| Published by Sony Interactive Entertainment in Japan only
| 
|-
! scope="row" | Gran Turismo Sport| PlayStation 4
| 
| Polyphony Digital
| 
| 
|-
! scope="row" | No Heroes Allowed! VR| PlayStation VR
| 
| Acquire
| Retail version in Asia, download only internationally
| 
|-
! scope="row" | Hidden Agenda| PlayStation 4
| 
| Supermassive Games
| 
| 
|-
! scope="row" | Knowledge is Power| PlayStation 4
| 
| Wish Studios
| 
| 
|-
! scope="row" | SingStar Celebration| PlayStation 4
| 
| London Studio
| 
| 
|-
! scope="row" | Stifled| PlayStation 4
| 
| 
|  PSN 
| 
|-
! scope="row" | Call of Duty: WWII| PlayStation 4
| 
| Sledgehammer Games
| Published by Sony Interactive Entertainment in Japan
| 
|-
! scope="row" | Jak II| PlayStation 4
| 
| Naughty Dog
|  PSN   PS2 Classic 
| 
|-
! scope="row" | Jak 3| PlayStation 4
| 
| Naughty Dog
|  PSN   PS2 Classic 
| 
|-
! scope="row" | Jak X: Combat Racing| PlayStation 4
| 
| Naughty Dog
|  PSN   PS2 Classic 
| 
|-
! scope="row" | Jak and Daxter Bundle| PlayStation 4
| 
| Mass Media Games
|  PSN 
| 
|-
! scope="row" | LocoRoco 2 Remastered| PlayStation 4
| 
| Japan Studio
| Retail version in Asia, download only internationally
| 
|-
! scope="row" | The Last Guardian VR Demo| PlayStation VR
| 
| GenDesignJapan Studio
|  PSN 
| 
|-

! scope="row" | The Inpatient| PlayStation VR
| 
| Supermassive Games
| 
| 
|-
! scope="row" | Guns Up!| Microsoft Windows
| 
| Valkyrie Entertainment
| 
| 
|-
! scope="row" | Shadow of the Colossus| PlayStation 4
| 
| Bluepoint GamesJapan Studio
| 
| 
|-
! scope="row" | Bravo Team| PlayStation VR
| 
| Supermassive Games
| 
| 
|-
! scope="row" | Frantics| PlayStation 4
| 
| 
| Retail version released in PAL only
| 
|-
! scope="row" | World of Warriors| PlayStation 4
| 
| Mind Candy
|  PSN 
| 
|- 
! scope="row" | MLB The Show 18| PlayStation 4
| 
| San Diego Studio
| 
| 
|-
! scope="row" | God of War| PlayStation 4
| 
| Santa Monica Studio
| 
| 
|-
! scope="row" | Animal Force| PlayStation VR
| 
| Oasis Games
|  PSN  Published by SIE outside North America
| 
|-
! scope="row" | Detroit: Become Human| PlayStation 4
| 
| Quantic Dream
| 
| 
|-
! scope="row" | Track Lab| PlayStation VR
| 
|  Little Chicken
|  PSN 
| 
|-
! scope="row" | Firewall: Zero Hour| PlayStation VR
| 
| First Contact Entertainment
| 
| 
|-
! scope="row" | Destiny 2: Forsaken| PlayStation 4
| 
| Bungie
| Co-published by Sony Interactive Entertainment in Japan only
| 
|-
! scope="row" | Marvel's Spider-Man| PlayStation 4
| 
| Insomniac Games
| 
| 
|-
! scope="row" | Astro Bot Rescue Mission| PlayStation VR
| 
| Team Asobi
| 
| 
|-
! scope="row" | Call of Duty: Black Ops 4| PlayStation 4
| 
| Treyarch
| Published by Sony Interactive Entertainment in Japan
| 
|-
! scope="row" | Déraciné| PlayStation VR
| 
| FromSoftwareJapan Studio
| 
| 
|-
! scope="row" | Tetris Effect| PlayStation 4
| 
| MonstarsResonair
| Retail Version
| 
|-
! scope="row" | Chimparty| PlayStation 4
| 
| NapNok
| Retail version released in PAL only
| 
|-
! scope="row" | Knowledge is Power: Decades| PlayStation 4
| 
| Wish Studios
| Retail version released in PAL only
| 
|-
! scope="row" | Quantic Dream Collection| PlayStation 4
| 
| Quantic Dream
| North America only
| 
|-
! scope="row" | Lemmings| iOS, Android
| 
| 
| Published under PlayStation Mobile
| 
|-

! scope="row" | GoGo Robottopuroguramingu ~Rojībo No Himitsu~| toio
| 
|
| Japan only
| 
|-
! scope="row" | Kōsaku Seibutsu Gezunroido| toio
| 
|
| Japan only
| 
|-
! scope="row" | Toio Korekushon| toio
| 
|
| Japan only
| 
|-
! scope="row" | MLB The Show 19| PlayStation 4
| 
| San Diego Studio
| 
| 
|-
! scope="row" | Immortal Legacy: The Jade Cipher| PlayStation VR
| 
| Viva Games
|  PSN 
| 
|-
! scope="row" | Days Gone| PlayStation 4
| 
| Bend Studio
| 
| 
|-
! scope="row" | Everybody's Golf VR| PlayStation VR
| 
| Clap HanzJapan Studio
| 
| 
|-
! scope="row" | Blood & Truth| PlayStation VR
| 
| London Studio
| 
| 
|-
! scope="row" | Erica| PlayStation 4
| 
| Flavourworks
|  PSN 
| 
|-
! scope="row" | ReadySet Heroes| Microsoft Windows, PlayStation 4
| 
| 
|  PSN 
| 
|-
! scope="row" | Concrete Genie| PlayStation 4
| 
| Pixelopus
| 
| 
|-
! scope="row" | Monkey King: Hero Is Back| PlayStation 4
| 
| 
| Published by Sony Interactive Entertainment in Asia only
|  
|-
! scope="row" | Call of Duty: Modern Warfare| PlayStation 4
| 
| Infinity Ward
| Published by Sony Interactive Entertainment in Japan
| 
|-
! scope="row" | MediEvil| PlayStation 4
| 
| Other Ocean Interactive
| 
| 
|-
! scope="row" | Death Stranding| PlayStation 4
| 
| Kojima Productions
| 
| 
|-
! scope="row" | Toio Doraibu| toio
| 
|
| Japan only
| 
|-
! scope="row" | 〜Min'nade Motto Tanoshimeru〜 Toio Korekushon Kakuchō Pakku| toio
| 
|
| Japan only
| 
|-

! scope="row" | Patapon 2 Remastered| PlayStation 4
| 
| Japan StudioPyramid
|  PSN 
| 
|-
! scope="row" | Dreams| PlayStation 4
| 
| Media Molecule
| 
| 
|-
! scope="row" | Nioh 2| PlayStation 4
| 
| Team Ninja
| Published by Sony Interactive Entertainment outside Asia
| 
|-
! scope="row" | MLB The Show 20| PlayStation 4
| 
| San Diego Studio
| 
| 
|-
! scope="row" | Tilt Brush| PlayStation VR
| 
| Google
|  PSN 
| 
|-
! scope="row" | Predator: Hunting Grounds| PlayStation 4, Microsoft Windows
| 
| IllFonic
| 
| 
|-
! scope="row" | The Last of Us Part II| PlayStation 4
| 
| Naughty Dog
| 
| 
|- 
! scope="row" | Marvel's Iron Man VR| PlayStation VR
| 
| Camouflaj
| 
| 
|-
! scope="row" | Ghost of Tsushima| PlayStation 4
| 
| Sucker Punch Productions
| 
| 
|-
! scope="row" | Horizon Zero Dawn| Microsoft Windows
| 
| Virtuos
| Co-published by THQ Nordic
| 
|-
! scope="row" | On Gaku de Asobou Pikotonzu| toio
| 
|
| Japan only
| 
|-
! scope="row" | Astro's Playroom| PlayStation 5
| 
| Team Asobi
|  PSN 
| 
|-
! scope="row" | Demon's Souls| PlayStation 5
| 
| Bluepoint GamesJapan Studio
| 
| 
|-
! scope="row" | Sackboy: A Big Adventure| PlayStation 4, PlayStation 5
| 
| Sumo Digital
| 
| 
|-
! scope="row" | Marvel's Spider-Man: Miles Morales| PlayStation 4, PlayStation 5
| 
| Insomniac Games
| 
| 
|- 
! scope="row" | Marvel's Spider-Man Remastered| PlayStation 5
| 
| Insomniac Games
|  PSN 
| 
|-
! scope="row" | Call of Duty: Black Ops Cold War| PlayStation 4, PlayStation 5
| 
| Treyarch  Raven Software
| Published by Sony Interactive Entertainment in Japan
| 
|-
! scope="row" | Dai Maō No Bijutsukan to Kaitō-Dan| toio
| 
|
| Japan only
| 
|-

! scope="row" | Destruction AllStars| PlayStation 5
| 
| Lucid Games
| Retail version released on April 7, 2021
| 
|-
! scope="row" | Nioh Remastered 
| PlayStation 5
| 
| Team Ninja
|  PSN  Published by Sony Interactive Entertainment outside Japan
| 
|-
! scope="row" | Nioh 2 Remastered 
| PlayStation 5
| 
| Team Ninja
|  PSN  Published by Sony Interactive Entertainment outside Japan
| 
|-
! scope="row" | The Nioh Collection| PlayStation 5
| 
| Team Ninja
| Published by Sony Interactive Entertainment outside Japan
| 
|-
! scope="row" | MLB The Show 21| PlayStation 4, PlayStation 5
| 
| San Diego Studio
| 
| 
|-
! scope="row" | Returnal| PlayStation 5
| 
| Housemarque
| 
| 
|-
! scope="row" | Days Gone | Microsoft Windows
| 
| Bend Studio
| 
| 
|-
! scope="row" | Ratchet & Clank: Rift Apart| PlayStation 5
| 
| Insomniac Games
| 
| 
|-
! scope="row" | Ghost of Tsushima Director's Cut| PlayStation 4, PlayStation 5
| 
| Sucker Punch Productions
| 
| 
|-
! scope="row" | Ghost of Tsushima: Legends| PlayStation 4, PlayStation 5
| 
| Sucker Punch Productions
|  PSN 
| 
|-
! scope="row" | Death Stranding Director's Cut| PlayStation 5
| 
| Kojima Productions
| 
| 
|-
! scope="row" | Call of Duty: Vanguard| PlayStation 4, PlayStation 5
| 
| Sledgehammer Games
| Published by Sony Interactive Entertainment in Japan
| 
|-

! scope="row" | God of War | Microsoft Windows
| 
| Jetpack Interactive
| 
| 
|-
! scope="row" | Uncharted: Legacy of Thieves Collection| PlayStation 5
| 
| Naughty DogIron Galaxy
| 
| 
|- 
! scope="row" | Horizon Forbidden West| PlayStation 4, PlayStation 5
| 
| Guerrilla Games
| 
| 
|-
! scope="row" | Gran Turismo 7| PlayStation 4, PlayStation 5
| 
| Polyphony Digital
| 
| 
|-
! scope="row" | MLB The Show 22| PlayStation 4, PlayStation 5
| 
| San Diego Studio
| 
| 
|-
! scope="row" | Ape Escape| PlayStation 4, PlayStation 5
| 
| Japan Studio
|  PSN   PS One Classic 
| 
|-
! scope="row" | Echochrome| PlayStation 4, PlayStation 5
| 
| Japan Studio
|  PSN   PSP Classic 
| 
|-
! scope="row" | Hot Shots Golf| PlayStation 4, PlayStation 5
| 
| Camelot Software PlanningJapan Studio
|  PSN   PS One Classic 
| 
|-
! scope="row" | I.Q.: Intelligent Qube| PlayStation 4, PlayStation 5
| 
| Epics
|  PSN   PS One Classic 
| 
|-
! scope="row" | Jumping Flash!| PlayStation 4, PlayStation 5
| 
| ExactUltra
|  PSN   PS One Classic 
| 
|-
! scope="row" | Syphon Filter| PlayStation 4, PlayStation 5
| 
| Bend Studio
|  PSN   PS One Classic 
| 
|-
! scope="row" | Wild Arms| PlayStation 4, PlayStation 5
| 
| Media.VisionJapan Studio
|  PSN   PS One Classic 
| 
|- 
! scope="row" | Super Stardust Portable| PlayStation 5
| 
| Housemarque
|  PSN   PSP Classic 
| 
|-
! scope="row" | Echoshift| PlayStation 4, PlayStation 5
| 
| Artoon
|  PSN   PSP Classic 
| 
|-
! scope="row" | LocoRoco Midnight Carnival| PlayStation 4, PlayStation 5
| 
| Japan Studio
|  PSN   PSP Classic 
| 
|-
! scope="row" | No Heroes Allowed!| PlayStation 4, PlayStation 5
| 
| Acquire
|  PSN   PSP Classic 
| 
|-
! scope="row" | Marvel's Spider-Man Remastered| Microsoft Windows
| 
| Nixxes Software
| 
| 
|-
! scope="row" | The Last of Us Part I| PlayStation 5
| 
| Naughty Dog
| 
| 
|-
! scope="row" | Kingdom of Paradise| PlayStation 4, PlayStation 5
| 
| Climax Entertainment
|  PSN   PSP Classic 
| 
|-
! scope="row" | Syphon Filter 2| PlayStation 4, PlayStation 5
| 
| Bend Studio
|  PSN   PS One Classic 
| 
|-
! scope="row" | Uncharted: Legacy of Thieves Collection| Microsoft Windows
| 
| Naughty DogIron Galaxy
| 
| 
|-
! scope="row" | Sackboy: A Big Adventure| Microsoft Windows
| 
| Sumo Digital
| 
| 
|-
! scope="row" | God of War Ragnarök| PlayStation 4, PlayStation 5
| 
| Santa Monica Studio
| 
| 
|-
! scope="row" | Marvel's Spider-Man: Miles Morales| Microsoft Windows
| 
| Nixxes Software
| 
| 
|-
! scope="row" | The Last of Us Part I| Microsoft Windows
| 
| Naughty Dog
| 
| 
|-
! Convallaria
| PlayStation 5
| 
| Loong Force
|
|
|-
! scope="row" | Marvel's Spider-Man 2| PlayStation 5
| 
| Insomniac Games
| 
| 
|-
! scope="row" | Stellar Blade| PlayStation 5
| 
| Shift Up 
| 
| 
|-
! scope="row" | Returnal| Microsoft Windows
| 
| Housemarque  Climax Studios
| 
| 
|-
! scope="row" | Horizon Call of the Mountain| PlayStation VR2
| 
| Firesprite  Guerrilla Games
| 
| 
|-
! scope="row" | Lost Soul Aside| PlayStation 5
| 
| UltiZero Games
|
|
|-
! scope="row" | Rise of the Ronin| PlayStation 5
| 
| Team Ninja
| 
| 
|-
! scope="row" | Marvel's Wolverine| PlayStation 5
| 
| Insomniac Games
| 
| 
|-
! scope="row" | Star Wars: Knights of the Old Republic Remake| PlayStation 5
| 
| Aspyr  Saber Interactive
| 
|
|-
! scope="row" | Firewall Ultra| PlayStation VR2
| 
| First Contact Entertainment
| 
| 
|-
! scope="row" | Doko Demo Issho| PlayStation Portable
| 
| 
| Japan only
| 
|-
! scope="row" | Ape Escape Academy| PlayStation Portable
| 
| Shift
| 
| 
|-
! scope="row" | Ape Escape: On the Loose| PlayStation Portable
| 
| Japan Studio
| 
| 
|-
! scope="row" | Archer Maclean's Mercury| PlayStation Portable
| 
| Awesome Studios
| Japan only
| 
|-
! scope="row" | ATV Offroad Fury: Blazin' Trails| PlayStation Portable
| 
| Climax Studios (Climax Racing)
| North America only
| 
|-
! scope="row" | Everybody's Golf Portable| PlayStation Portable
| 
| Clap HanzJapan Studio
| 
| 
|-
! scope="row" | F1 Grand Prix| PlayStation Portable
| 
| Traveller's Tales
| 
| 
|-
! scope="row" | Fired Up| PlayStation Portable
| 
| London Studio
| 
| 
|-
! scope="row" | Glorace: Phantastic Carnival| PlayStation Portable
| 
| 
| South Korea only
| 
|-
! scope="row" | Go! Sudoku| PlayStation Portable
| 
| 
| Japan and PAL only
| 
|-
! scope="row" | Gretzky NHL| PlayStation Portable
| 
| 
| North America only
| 
|-
! scope="row" | Gretzky NHL 06| PlayStation Portable
| 
| 
| North America only
| 
|-
! scope="row" | Hand Dic| PlayStation Portable
| 
| 
| South Korea only
| 
|-
! scope="row" | MediEvil: Resurrection| PlayStation Portable
| 
| Cambridge Studio
| 
| 
|-
! scope="row" | MLB| PlayStation Portable
| 
| 
| North America and South Korea only
| 
|-
! scope="row" | Namco Museum Battle Collection| PlayStation Portable
| 
| 
| Co-published with Namco in PAL only
| 
|-
! scope="row" | NBA| PlayStation Portable
| 
| 
| North America only
| 
|-
! scope="row" | PoPoLoCrois| PlayStation Portable
| 
| 
| Japan only
| 
|-
! scope="row" | Pursuit Force| PlayStation Portable
| 
| Bigbig Studios
| PAL and North America only
| 
|-
! scope="row" | Ridge Racer| PlayStation Portable
| 
| 
| Co-published with Namco in PAL only
| 
|-
! scope="row" | SOCOM U.S. Navy SEALs: Fireteam Bravo| PlayStation Portable
| 
| Zipper Interactive
| 
| 
|-
! scope="row" | The Con| PlayStation Portable
| 
| 
| North America, South Korea and PAL only
| 
|-
! scope="row" | Twisted Metal: Head-On| PlayStation Portable
| 
| Incognito Entertainment
| 
| 
|-
! scope="row" | Untold Legends: Brotherhood of the Blade| PlayStation Portable
| 
| Sony Online Entertainment
| Published by Sony Online Entertainment in North America only
| 
|-
! scope="row" | Wipeout Pure| PlayStation Portable
| 
| Studio Liverpool
| 
| 
|-
! scope="row" | World Tour Soccer: Challenge Edition| PlayStation Portable
| 
| 
| 
| 
|-
! scope="row" | WRC: FIA World Rally Championship| PlayStation Portable
| 
| Traveller's Tales
| PAL only
| 
|-
! scope="row" | Work Time Fun| PlayStation Portable
| 
| 
| Japan only
| 
|-
! scope="row" | Ace Combat X: Skies of Deception| PlayStation Portable
| 
| Access Games
| Co-published with Namco in PAL only
| 
|-
! scope="row" | Ape Escape Academy 2| PlayStation Portable
| 
| Shift
| Japan and PAL only
| 
|-
! scope="row" | Ape Escape Racing| PlayStation Portable
| 
| Epics
| Japan and Asia only
| 
|-
! scope="row" | ATV Offroad Fury Pro| PlayStation Portable
| 
| Climax Studios (Climax Racing)
| 
| 
|-
! scope="row" | Blade Dancer: Lineage of Light| PlayStation Portable
| 
| Hit Maker
| Japan only
| 
|-
! scope="row" | Blood+ Final Piece| PlayStation Portable
| 
| Japan Studio
| Japan only
| 
|-
! scope="row" | Blood: The Last Vampire| PlayStation Portable
| 
| Japan Studio
| Japan only
| 
|-
! scope="row" | Boku no Natsuyasumi| PlayStation Portable
| 
| Millennium Kitchen
| Japan only
| 
|-
! scope="row" | Daxter| PlayStation Portable
| 
| Ready at Dawn
| 
| 
|-
! scope="row" | Field Commander| PlayStation Portable
| 
| Sony Online Entertainment
| Published by Sony Online Entertainment in North America only
| 
|-
! scope="row" | Gangs of London| PlayStation Portable
| 
| London Studio
| 
| 
|-
! scope="row" | Killzone: Liberation| PlayStation Portable
| 
| Guerrilla Games
| 
| 
|-
! scope="row" | Kingdom of Paradise| PlayStation Portable
| 
| 
| 
| 
|-
! scope="row" | LocoRoco| PlayStation Portable
| 
| Japan Studio
| 
| 
|-
! scope="row" | Mercury Meltdown| PlayStation Portable
| 
| Ignition Entertainment
| Japan only
| 
|-
! scope="row" | Monster Kingdom: Jewel Summoner| PlayStation Portable
| 
| Gaia
| Japan only
| 
|-
! scope="row" | MotoGP| PlayStation Portable
| 
| 
| Co-published with Namco in PAL only
| 
|-
! scope="row" | Neopets: Petpet Adventures: The Wand of Wishing| PlayStation Portable
| 
| 
| North America only
| 
|-
! scope="row" | Passport to... Amsterdam| PlayStation Portable
| 
| 
| PAL only
| 
|-
! scope="row" | Passport to... Barcelona| PlayStation Portable
| 
| 
| PAL only
| 
|-
! scope="row" | Passport to... London| PlayStation Portable
| 
| 
| PAL only
| 
|-
! scope="row" | Passport to... Paris| PlayStation Portable
| 
| 
| PAL only
| 
|-
! scope="row" | Passport to... Prague| PlayStation Portable
| 
| 
| PAL only
| 
|-
! scope="row" | Passport to... Rome| PlayStation Portable
| 
| 
| PAL only
| 
|-
! scope="row" | Ridge Racer 2| PlayStation Portable
| 
| 
| Co-published with Namco in PAL only
| 
|-
! scope="row" | SOCOM U.S. Navy SEALs: Fireteam Bravo 2| PlayStation Portable
| 
| Zipper Interactive
| 
| 
|-
! scope="row" | Syphon Filter: Dark Mirror| PlayStation Portable
| 
| Bend Studio
| 
| 
|-
! scope="row" | Talkman| PlayStation Portable
| 
| 
| 
| 
|-
! scope="row" | Tekken: Dark Resurrection| PlayStation Portable
| 
| 
| Co-published with Namco Bandai Games in PAL only
| 
|-
! scope="row" | Tenchi no Mon 2: Busouden| PlayStation Portable
| 
| 
| Japan only
| 
|-
! scope="row" | Untold Legends: The Warrior's Code| PlayStation Portable
| 
| Sony Online Entertainment
| Published by Sony Online Entertainment in North America only
| 
|-
! scope="row" | World Tour Soccer 06| PlayStation Portable
| 
| 
| 
| 
|-
! scope="row" | XI Coliseum| PlayStation Portable
| 
| 
| Japan only
| 
|-
! scope="row" | Ape Escape: SaruSaru Big Mission| PlayStation Portable
| 
| h.a.n.d.
| Japan only
| 
|-
! scope="row" | Jeanne d'Arc| PlayStation Portable
| 
| Level-5Japan Studio
| Japan and North America only
| 
|-
! scope="row" | PaRappa the Rapper| PlayStation Portable
| 
| 
| 
| 
|-
! scope="row" | Pursuit Force: Extreme Justice| PlayStation Portable
| 
| Bigbig Studios
| PAL and North America only
| 
|-
! scope="row" | Ratchet & Clank: Size Matters| PlayStation Portable
| 
| High Impact Games
| 
| 
|-
! scope="row" | Rezel Cross| PlayStation Portable
| 
| 
| Japan only
| 
|-
! scope="row" | Smash Court Tennis 3| PlayStation Portable
| 
| 
| Co-published with Namco in PAL only
| 
|-
! scope="row" | SOCOM U.S. Navy SEALs: Tactical Strike| PlayStation Portable
| 
| Slant Six Games
| 
| 
|-
! scope="row" | Syphon Filter: Logan's Shadow| PlayStation Portable
| 
| Bend Studio
| 
| 
|-
! scope="row" | What Did I Do to Deserve This, My Lord?| PlayStation Portable
| 
| 
| Japan only
| 
|-
! scope="row" | Wild Arms XF| PlayStation Portable
| 
| Media.VisionJapan Studio
| Japan only
| 
|-
! scope="row" | Wipeout Pulse| PlayStation Portable
| 
| Studio Liverpool
| 
| 
|-
! scope="row" | Ape Quest| PlayStation Portable
| 
| Shift
| Retail version in Japan only
| 
|-
! scope="row" | Beats| PlayStation Portable
| 
| London Studio
| 
| 
|-
! scope="row" | Syphon Filter: Combat Ops| PlayStation Portable
| 
| Bend Studio
| 
| 
|-
! scope="row" | Buzz!: Brain Bender| PlayStation Portable
| 
| Curve Studios
| PAL only
| 
|-
! scope="row" | Buzz!: Master Quiz| PlayStation Portable
| 
| Relentless SoftwareCurve Studios
| 
| 
|-
! scope="row" | Coded Soul: Uketsugareshi Idea| PlayStation Portable
| 
| GaiaJapan Studio
| Japan and South Korea only
| 
|-
! scope="row" | Echochrome| PlayStation Portable
| 
| 
| Retail version in Japan and PAL only
| 
|-
! scope="row" | Everybody's Golf Portable 2| PlayStation Portable
| 
| Clap HanzJapan Studio
| 
| 
|-
! scope="row" | God of War: Chains of Olympus| PlayStation Portable
| 
| Ready at Dawn
| North America and PAL only
| 
|-
! scope="row" | LocoRoco 2| PlayStation Portable
| 
| Japan Studio
| 
| 
|-
! scope="row" | Patapon| PlayStation Portable
| 
| Japan StudioPyramid
| 
| 
|-
! scope="row" | Secret Agent Clank| PlayStation Portable
| 
| High Impact Games
| 
| 
|-
! scope="row" | What Did I Do to Deserve This, My Lord?| PlayStation Portable
| 
| 
| Japan only
| 
|-
! scope="row" | Brain Challenge| PlayStation Portable
| 
| Gameloft
| North America only
| 
|-
! scope="row" | Everyday Shooter| PlayStation Portable
| 
| 
| 
| 
|-
! scope="row" | Flow| PlayStation Portable
| 
| SuperVillain Studios
| 
| 
|-
! scope="row" | Mainichi Issho Portable| PlayStation Portable
| 
| 
| Japan only
| 
|-
! scope="row" | Super Stardust Portable| PlayStation Portable
| 
| Housemarque
| 
| 
|-
! scope="row" | Boku no Natsuyasumi 4: Seitouchi Shounen Tanteidan, Boku to Himitsu no Chizu| PlayStation Portable
| 
| Millennium Kitchen
| Japan only
| 
|-
! scope="row" | Chandrugpta: Warrior Prince| PlayStation Portable
| 
| 
| India only
| 
|-
! scope="row" | Desi Adda: Games of India| PlayStation Portable
| 
| Gameshastra
| India only
| 
|-
! scope="row" | Enkaku Sōsa: Shinjitsu e no 23 Nichikan| PlayStation Portable
| 
| Media.VisionJapan Studio
| 
| 
|-
! scope="row" | Ghostbusters: The Video Game| PlayStation Portable
| 
| Red Fly Studio
| PAL only
| 
|-
! scope="row" | Gran Turismo| PlayStation Portable
| 
| Polyphony Digital
| 
| 
|-
! scope="row" | Invizimals| PlayStation Portable
| 
| Novarama
| PAL and North America only
| 
|-
! scope="row" | LittleBigPlanet| PlayStation Portable
| 
| Cambridge Studio
| 
| 
|-
! scope="row" | NBA 10 The Inside| PlayStation Portable
| 
| San Diego Studio
| North America only
| 
|-
! scope="row" | Patapon 2| PlayStation Portable
| 
| Japan StudioPyramid
| 
| 
|-
! scope="row" | Resistance: Retribution| PlayStation Portable
| 
| Bend Studio
| 
| 
|-
! scope="row" | LocoRoco Midnight Carnival| PlayStation Portable
| 
| Japan Studio
| 
| 
|-
! scope="row" | Numblast| PlayStation Portable
| 
| 
| 
| 
|-
! scope="row" | Pinball Heroes| PlayStation Portable
| 
| San Diego Studio
| 
| 
|-
! scope="row" | PixelJunk Monsters Deluxe| PlayStation Portable
| 
| Q-Games
| North America and PAL only
| 
|-
! scope="row" | Savage Moon The Hera Campaign| PlayStation Portable
|  
| 
| 
| 
|-
! scope="row" | Echoshift| PlayStation Portable
|  
| 
| Retail version in Japan and PAL only
| 
|-
! scope="row" | Everybody's Tennis Portable| PlayStation Portable
| 
| Clap HanzJapan Studio
| 
| 
|-
! scope="row" | EyePet| PlayStation Portable
| 
| 
| 
| 
|-
! scope="row" | Fat Princess: Fistful of Cake| PlayStation Portable
| 
| Titan Studios
| PAL and North America only
| 
|-
! scope="row" | God of War: Ghost of Sparta| PlayStation Portable
| 
| Ready at Dawn
| 
| 
|-
! scope="row" | Invizimals: Shadow Zone| PlayStation Portable
| 
| Novarama
| PAL and North America only
| 
|-
! scope="row" | Jungle Party| PlayStation Portable
| 
| Magenta Software
| 
| 
|-
! scope="row" | ModNation Racers| PlayStation Portable
| 
| San Diego Studio
| 
| 
|-
! scope="row" | Patito Feo: el juego màs bonito| PlayStation Portable
| 
| 
| PAL only: Spain, Portugal and Italy
| 
|-
! scope="row" | SOCOM U.S. Navy SEALs: Fireteam Bravo 3| PlayStation Portable
| 
| Slant Six Games
| 
| 
|-
! scope="row" | Street Cricket Champions| PlayStation Portable
| 
| 
| India only
| 
|-
! scope="row" | The Eye of Judgment: Legends| PlayStation Portable
| 
| 
| Retail version in Japan and PAL only
| 
|-
! scope="row" | Everybody's Stress Buster| PlayStation Portable
| 
| Clap HanzJapan Studio
| Retail version in Japan and Asia only
| 
|-
! scope="row" | Gravity Crash| PlayStation Portable
| 
| Just Add Water
| 
| 
|-
! scope="row" | No Heroes Allowed!| PlayStation Portable
| 
| Acquire
| Retail version in Japan only
| 
|-
! scope="row" | Patchwork Heroes| PlayStation Portable
| 
| 
| Retail version in Japan onlyAnnouncing Patchwork Heroes for PSP. PlayStation.Blog
| 
|-
! scope="row" | Pinball Heroes Bundle 2| PlayStation Portable
| 
| 
| 
| 
|-
! scope="row" | Buzz!: The Ultimate Music Quiz| PlayStation Portable
| 
| Relentless Software
| PAL only
| 
|-
! scope="row" | Disney•Pixar Cars 2| PlayStation Portable
| 
| Virtual Toys
| PAL and North America only
| 
|-
! scope="row" | Cart Kings| PlayStation Portable
| 
| 
| India only
| 
|-
! scope="row" | EyePet Adventures| PlayStation Portable
| 
| 
| PAL only
| 
|-
! scope="row" | Geronimo Stilton in The Kingdom of Fantasy The Videogame| PlayStation Portable
| 
| 
| Retail version in PAL, download only in North America
| 
|-
! scope="row" | Invizimals: The Lost Tribes| PlayStation Portable
| 
| 
| Retail version in PAL, download only in North America
| 
|-
! scope="row" | Patapon 3| PlayStation Portable
| 
| Japan StudioPyramid
| 
| 
|-
! scope="row" | The Mystery Team| PlayStation Portable
| 
| 
| PAL only
| 
|-
! scope="row" | White Knight Chronicles: Origins| PlayStation Portable
| 
| Matrix SoftwareJapan Studio
| Japan and PAL only
| 
|-
! scope="row" | Geronimo Stilton: Return to The Kingdom of Fantasy The Videogame| PlayStation Portable
| 
| 
| Retail version in PAL, download only in North America
| 
|-
! scope="row" | Phineas and Ferb: Across the 2nd Dimension| PlayStation Portable
| 
| 
| PAL and North America only
| 
|-
! scope="row" | Street Cricket Champions 2| PlayStation Portable
| 
| 
| India only
| 
|-
! scope="row" | Invizimals: Hidden Challenges| PlayStation Portable, PlayStation Vita
| 
| Novarama
| PAL only
| 
|-
! scope="row" | Everybody's Golf 6| PlayStation Vita
| 
| Clap HanzJapan Studio
| 
| 
|-
! scope="row" | Gravity Rush| PlayStation Vita
| 
| Japan Studio (Team Gravity)
| 
| 
|-
! scope="row" | LittleBigPlanet PS Vita| PlayStation Vita
| 
| Double ElevenTarsier StudiosXDev
| 
| 
|-
! scope="row" | Little Deviants| PlayStation Vita
| 
| Bigbig Studios
| 
| 
|-
! scope="row" | ModNation Racers: Road Trip| PlayStation Vita
| 
| San Diego Studio
| 
| 
|-
! scope="row" | Reality Fighters| PlayStation Vita
| 
| 
| 
| 
|-
! scope="row" | Resistance: Burning Skies| PlayStation Vita
| 
| nStigate Games
| 
| 
|-
! scope="row" | Smart As...| PlayStation Vita
| 
| Climax Studios
| 
| 
|-
! scope="row" | Uncharted: Golden Abyss| PlayStation Vita
| 
| Bend Studio
| 
| 
|-
! scope="row" | Unit 13| PlayStation Vita
| 
| Zipper Interactive
| 
| 
|-
! scope="row" | Wipeout 2048| PlayStation Vita
| 
| Studio Liverpool
| 
| 
|-
! scope="row" | Cliff Diving| PlayStation Vita
| 
| 
| 
| 
|-
! scope="row" | Ecolibrium| PlayStation Vita
| 
| StormBASIC
| 
| 
|-
! scope="row" | Escape Plan| PlayStation Vita
| 
| Fun Bits
| 
| 
|-
! scope="row" | Fireworks| PlayStation Vita
| 
| 
| 
| 
|-
! scope="row" | Frobisher Says!| PlayStation Vita
| 
| Honeyslug
| 
| 
|-
! scope="row" | Hustle Kings| PlayStation Vita
| 
| VooFoo Studios
| 
| 
|-
! scope="row" | Paint Park| PlayStation Vita
| 
| 
| 
| 
|-
! scope="row" | Plants vs. Zombies| PlayStation Vita
| 
| PopCap Games
| Published by Sony Online Entertainment in North America and PAL only
| 
|-
! scope="row" | PulzAR| PlayStation Vita
| 
| 
| 
| 
|-
! scope="row" | Sound Shapes| PlayStation Vita
| 
| Queasy Games
| 
| 
|-
! scope="row" | Super Stardust Delta| PlayStation Vita
| 
| Housemarque
| 
| 
|-
! scope="row" | t@g| PlayStation Vita
| 
| 
| 
| 
|-
! scope="row" | Table Football| PlayStation Vita
| 
| 
| 
| 
|-
! scope="row" | Table Ice Hockey| PlayStation Vita
| 
| 
| 
| 
|-
! scope="row" | Table Top Tanks| PlayStation Vita
| 
| 
| 
| 
|-
! scope="row" | Top Darts| PlayStation Vita
| 
| Devil's Details
| 
| 
|-
! scope="row" | Travel Bug| PlayStation Vita
| 
| 
| 
| 
|-
! scope="row" | Treasure Park| PlayStation Vita
| 
| 
| 
| 
|-
! scope="row" | Uncharted: Fight for Fortune| PlayStation Vita
| 
| Bend StudioOne Loop Games
| 
| 
|-
! scope="row" | Disney Epic Mickey 2: The Power of Two| PlayStation Vita
| 
| Junction Point Studios
| Retail version in PAL, download only in North America
| 
|-
! scope="row" | Invizimals: The Alliance| PlayStation Vita
| 
| Novarama
| Retail version in PAL, download only in North America
| 
|-
! scope="row" | Jak and Daxter Trilogy| PlayStation Vita
| 
| Mass Media Games
| 
| 
|-
! scope="row" | Killzone: Mercenary| PlayStation Vita
| 
| Guerrilla Cambridge
| 
| 
|-
! scope="row" | Soul Sacrifice| PlayStation Vita
| 
| Marvelous AQLJapan Studio
| 
| 
|-
! scope="row" | The Walking Dead: The Complete First Season| PlayStation Vita
| 
| Telltale Games
| 
| 
|-
! scope="row" | Flower| PlayStation Vita
| 
| Bluepoint Games
| 
| 
|-
! scope="row" | Jacob Jones and the Bigfoot Mystery| PlayStation Vita
| 
| 
| 
| 
|-
! scope="row" | Imaginstruments| PlayStation Vita
| 
| 
| 
| 
|-
! scope="row" | Malicious Rebirth| PlayStation Vita
| 
| 
| 
| 
|-
! scope="row" | Open Me!| PlayStation Vita
| 
| 
| 
| 
|-
! scope="row" | Paint Park Plus| PlayStation Vita
| 
| 
| 
| 
|-
! scope="row" | PlayStation Home Arcade| PlayStation Vita
| 
| 
| 
| 
|-
! scope="row" | Ratchet & Clank: Full Frontal Assault| PlayStation Vita
| 
| Tin Giant
| 
| 
|-
! scope="row" | Table Mini Golf| PlayStation Vita
| 
| 
| 
| 
|-
! scope="row" | Wake-up Club| PlayStation Vita
| 
| 
| 
| 
|-
! scope="row" | Pinball Heroes| PlayStation 4, PlayStation 5
| 
| San Diego Studio
|  PSN   PSP Classic 
| 
|-
! scope="row" | Everybody's Golf 2| PlayStation 4, PlayStation 5
| 
| Clap Hanz
|  PSN   PS One Classic 
| 
|-
! scope="row" | Syphon Filter 3| PlayStation 4, PlayStation 5
| 
| Bend Studio
|  PSN   PS One Classic 
| 
|}

 PlayStation 

 1994 

 Retail Crime Crackers (Japan only) Motor Toon Grand Prix (Japan only) 1995 

 Retail 3D Lemmings (Published by Psygnosis) Air Combat (Co-published with Namco in PAL only) Arc the Lad (Japan only) Battle Arena Toshinden (Co-published with Takara in North America and PAL only) Beyond the Beyond (Japan & North America only) Cyber Sled (Co-Published with Namco in PAL only) Destruction Derby (Published by Psygnosis) Discworld (video game) (Published by Psygnosis) ESPN Extreme Games/1Xtreme Hermie Hopperhead: Scrap Panic (Japan only) Jumping Flash! Kileak: The Blood Mortal Kombat 3 (Co-published with Midway Games) NHL FaceOff (North America and PAL only) Novastorm (Published by Psygnosis) Philosoma Project: Horned Owl (Japan and North America only) Rapid Reload (Japan and PAL only) Ridge Racer (Co-published with Namco in PAL only) Sengoku Cyber: Fujimaru Jigokuhen (Japan only) Sentou Kokka: Air Land Battle (Japan only) Shanghai: Banri no Choujou (Japan only) Tekken (Co-published with Namco in PAL only) The Raiden Project (North America only) Twisted Metal Victory Zone (Japan only) Warhawk Wipeout (Published by Psygnosis) Wizardry VII: Gadeia no Houshu (Japan only) 1996 

 Retail 2Xtreme A-IV Evolution Global (Co-published with Artdink in PAL only) Adidas Power Soccer (Published by Psygnosis) Aquanaut's Holiday (North America and PAL only) Arc the Lad II (Japan only) Assault Rigs (Published by Psygnosis) Battle Arena Toshinden 2 (Co-published with Takara in PAL only) Broken Sword: The Shadow of the Templars (PAL only) Chronicles of the Sword (Published by Psygnosis in North America and PAL only) Cool Boarders (North America and PAL only) Crash Bandicoot Defcon 5 (Published by Psygnosis in PAL only) Destruction Derby 2 (Published by Psygnosis) Epidemic Formula 1 (Published by Psygnosis) Galaxian^3 (Co-published with Namco in PAL only) Jet Moto Jumping Flash! 2 Krazy Ivan (Published by Psygnosis) Mickey's Wild Adventure (Co-published with Disney Interactive in PAL only) MLB Pennant Race (North America only) Motor Toon Grand Prix 2 Myst (Published by Psygnosis) Namco Museum Vol. 1 (Co-published with Namco in PAL only) Namco Museum Vol. 2 (Co-published with Namco in PAL only) Namco Soccer Prime Goal (Co-published with Namco in PAL only) Namco Tennis Smash Court (Co-published with Namco in PAL only) NBA ShootOut NCAA GameBreaker (North America only) NFL GameDay (North America and PAL only) NFL GameDay 97 (North America only) NHL FaceOff '97 Pandemonium (Co-published with Crystal Dynamics in PAL only) PaRappa the Rapper Penny Racers (Co-published with Takara in PAL only) Popolocrois Story (Japan only) Raging Skies (Co-published with Asmik Ace Entertainment in PAL only) RayStorm (Co-published with Taito in PAL only) Ridge Racer Revolution (Co-published with Namco in PAL only) Samurai Shodown III: Blades of Blood (Co-published with SNK in North America and PAL only) StarBlade Alpha (Co-published with Namco in PAL only) Tekken 2 (Co-published with Namco in PAL only) The Adventures of Lomax (Published by Psygnosis) The King of Fighters '95 (Co-published with SNK in North America and PAL only) Tobal No. 1 (Co-published with Squaresoft in North America and PAL only) Twisted Metal 2 Victory Zone 2 (Japan only) Wipeout 2097 (Published by Psygnosis) 1997 

 Retail Ace Combat 2 (Co-published with Namco in PAL only) Adidas Power Soccer International 97 (Published by Psygnosis) Alundra (Published by Sony Computer Entertainment in Japan and by Psygnosis in PAL only) Battle Arena Toshinden 3 (Co-published with Takara in PAL only) Bloody Roar (North America only) Broken Sword II: The Smoking Mirror (PAL only) Bushido Blade (Co-published with Squaresoft in North America and PAL only) Carnage Heart (Co-published with Artdink in North America and PAL only) CART World Series (North America only) Crime Crackers 2 (Japan only) Colony Wars (Published by Psygnosis) Cool Boarders 2 (North America and PAL only) Crash Bandicoot 2: Cortex Strikes Back Discworld II: Missing Presumed...?! (Published by Psygnosis) Disney's Hercules (Co-published with Disney Interactive in PAL only) Final Fantasy VII (Co-published with Squaresoft in North America and PAL only) Formula 1 97 (Published by Psygnosis) G-Police (Published by Psygnosis) Ghost in the Shell (Japan and PAL only) I.Q.: Intelligent Qube Jet Moto 2 King's Field (Co-published with From Software in PAL only) League of Pain (Published by Psygnosis) Lifeforce Tenka (Published by Psygnosis in North America and PAL only) MLB 98 (North America only) Monster Trucks (Published by Psygnosis in North America and PAL only) Namco Museum Vol. 3 (Co-published with Namco in PAL only) Namco Museum Vol. 4 (Co-published with Namco in PAL only) Namco Museum Vol. 5 (Co-published with Namco in PAL only) NBA ShootOut '97 NCAA Gamebreaker 98 (North America only) NFL GameDay 98 (North America only) NHL FaceOff 98 (North America and PAL only) Overboard! (Published by Psygnosis) Porsche Challenge Princess Maker: Yumemiru Yousei (Japan only) Quest for Fame (Japan only) Rage Racer (Co-published with Namco in PAL only) Rally Cross Rapid Racer Ray Tracers (Co-published with Taito in PAL only) Real Bout Fatal Fury (Co-published with SNK in PAL only) Rosco McQueen Firefighter Extreme (Published by Psygnosis) Rush Hour (Published by Psygnosis) SAPARi (Co-Published with VAIO) Sentient (Published by Psygnosis in North America only) Shadow Master (Published by Psygnosis in North America and PAL only) Soul Blade  (Co-published with Namco in PAL only) Spawn: The Eternal Steel Reign Tail of the Sun (Co-published with Artdink in North America only) The City of Lost Children (Published by Psygnosis in North America and PAL only) Time Crisis (Co-published with Namco in PAL only) Velldeselba Senki Tsubasa no Kunshou (Japan only) Wild Arms Xevious 3D/G+ (Co-published with Namco in PAL only) Z (Co-published with GT Interactive in PAL only) 1998 

 Retail Adidas Power Soccer 2 (Published by Psygnosis) Adidas Power Soccer 98 (Published by Psygnosis) Armored Core (Co-published with From Software in PAL only) Baby Universe (Japan and PAL only) Blast Radius (Published by Psygnosis) Blasto Bomberman World (Co-published with Hudson in PAL only) Bust a Groove (Co-published with Enix by 989 Studios in North America and by Sony Computer Entertainment in PAL only) Cardinal Syn Colony Wars: Vengeance (Published by Psygnosis) Contender (North America only) Cool Boarders 3 (Published by 989 Sports in North America and by Sony Computer Entertainment in PAL only) Crash Bandicoot: Warped Dead or Alive (Co-published with Tecmo in PAL only) Devil Dice (Japan and PAL only) Double Cast (Japan only) Disney•Pixar A Bug's Life (Co-published with Disney Interactive) Ehrgeiz: God Bless the Ring (Co-published with Squaresoft in Japan and PAL only) Einhänder (Co-published with Squaresoft in North America only) ESPN X Games Pro Boarder (Co-published with ESPN Digital Games in PAL only) Everybody's Golf Final Fantasy Tactics (Co-published with Squaresoft in North America only) Fluid (Japan and PAL only) Formula 1 98 (Published by Psygnosis in North America and PAL only) Gran Turismo Jersey Devil (North America only) Kisetsu o Dakishimete (Japan only) Klonoa: Door to Phantomile (Co-published with Namco in PAL only) Kula World (Published by Sony Computer Entertainment in Japan and PAL, and by Psygnosis in North America only) Legend of Legaia Libero Grande (Co-published with Namco in PAL only) MediEvil MLB 99 (North America only) NBA ShootOut '98 (Published by 989 Sports in North America and by Sony Computer Entertainment in PAL only) NCAA Final Four 99 (Published by 989 Sports in North America only) NCAA Gamebreaker 99 (Published by 989 Sports in North America only) Newman/Haas Racing (Published by Psygnosis) NFL GameDay 99 (Published by 989 Sports in North America only) NFL Xtreme (Published by 989 Sports in North America and by Sony Computer Entertainment in PAL only) NHL FaceOff 99 (Published by 989 Sports in North America and PAL only) Nightmare Creatures (Co-published with Kalisto Entertainment in PAL only) O.D.T. – Escape... Or Die Trying (Published by Psygnosis) Oh No! More Lemmings (Published by Studio Liverpool) Pet in TV (Japan and PAL only) Point Blank (Co-published with Namco in PAL only) Poporogue (Japan only) Psybadek (Published by Psygnosis in North America and PAL only) Rally Cross 2 Rascal (Published by Psygnosis in North America and PAL only) Running Wild SaGa Frontier (Co-published with Squaresoft in North America only) Sampaguita (Japan only) Sentinel Returns (Published by Psygnosis) Souten no Shiroki Kami no Za: Great Peak (Japan only) Spice World (Published by Sony Computer Entertainment in PAL and by Psygnosis in North America only) Tekken 3 (Co-published with Namco in PAL only) The Fifth Element (Co-published with Kalisto Entertainment in PAL only) Tomba! (North America and PAL only) Treasures of the Deep (Co-published with Namco in PAL only) Twisted Metal III (Published by 989 Studios in North America only) Yukiwari no Hana (Japan only) Zero Divide 2 (Co-published with Zoom in PAL only) 1999 

 Retail 3Xtreme (Published by 989 Sports in North America only) Alundra 2: A New Legend Begins (Japan only) Anna Kournikova's Smash Court Tennis (Co-published with Namco in PAL only) Ape Escape (PocketStation support) Arc the Lad III (Japan only) (PocketStation support) Attack of the Saucerman (Published by Psygnosis) Barbie: Race & Ride (PAL only) Bloodlines (PAL only) Bloody Roar II (North America only) Brightis (Japan only) (PocketStation support) Cool Boarders 4 (Published by 989 Sports in North America and PAL only) Crash Bandicoot 3: Warped (PocketStation support) Crash Team Racing Destrega (Co-published with Koei in PAL only) Disney•Pixar A Bug's Life Activity Center (Co-published with Disney Interactive in PAL only) Disney's Magical Tetris (Co-published with Disney Interactive in PAL only) Disney's Tarzan (Co-published with Disney Interactive in PAL only) Doko Demo Issyo (Japan only) (PocketStation support) Eliminator (Published by Psygnosis) Final Fantasy VIII (Co-published with Squaresoft in PAL, China, Hong Kong and Singapore only) 
 Formula One 99 (Published by Psygnosis in North America and Japan, and by Sony Computer Entertainment in PAL) G-Police: Weapons of Justice (Published by Psygnosis in North America and by Sony Computer Entertainment in PAL only) Global Domination (Published by Psygnosis) Global Force: Shin Sentou Kokka (Japan only) Gran Turismo 2 Grandia (North America only) Jet Moto 3 (Published by 989 Sports in North America only) Kingsley's Adventure (Published by Psygnosis in North America and PAL only) Kurushi Final: Mental Blocks (PocketStation support) Love & Destroy (Japan only) MLB 2000 (Published by 989 Sports in North America only) NBA ShootOut 2000 (Published by 989 Sports in North America only) NCAA Final Four 99 (Published by 989 Sports in North America only) NCAA Final Four 2000 (Published by 989 Sports in North America only) NCAA Gamebreaker 2000 (Published by 989 Sports in North America only) NFL GameDay 2000 (Published by 989 Sports in North America only) NFL Xtreme 2 (Published by 989 Sports in North America only) NHL FaceOff 2000 (Published by 989 Sports in North America and by Sony Computer Entertainment in PAL only) Omega Boost Ore no Ryouri (Japan only) Over My Remain/Ore no Shikabane o Koete Yuke (Japan only) Pocket Dungeon (Japan only) (PocketStation support) Pocket MuuMuu (Japan only) (PocketStation support) Point Blank 2 (Co-published with Namco in PAL only) Poporogue (Japan only) (PocketStation support) Pro 18: World Tour Golf (Published by Psygnosis) R-Type Delta (Co-published with Irem in PAL only) R4: Ridge Racer Type 4 (Co-published with Namco in PAL only) Retro Force (Published by Psygnosis in PAL only) Rollcage (Published by Psygnosis) Speed Freaks (North America and PAL only) Spyro the Dragon (PocketStation support) Star Ocean: The Second Story (Co-published with Enix in North America and PAL only) Supercross Circuit (Published by 989 Sports in North America only) Syphon Filter (Published by 989 Studios in North America and by Sony Computer Entertainment in PAL only) The Granstream Saga (Published by Sony Computer Entertainment in Japan and co-published with ARC Entertainment in PAL only) The X-Files Game (Co-published with Fox Interactive in PAL only) This is Football Tiny Tank: Up Your Arsenal (North America and PAL only) Tiny Toon Adventures: Buster and the beanstalk (PAL only) Tomba! 2: The Evil Swine Return (North America and PAL only) Tomoyasu Hotei: Stolen Song (Japan only) Twisted Metal 4 (Published by 989 Studios in North America only) UmJammer Lammy Vib-Ribbon (Japan and PAL only) Wipeout 3 (Published by Sony Computer Entertainment in PAL and Japan, and by Psygnosis in North America) XI Jumbo (Japan only) 2000 

 Retail Ace Combat 3: Electrosphere (Co-published with Namco in PAL only) Aconcagua (Japan only) Barbie Super Sports (PAL only) Bealphareth (Japan only) Boku no Natsuyasumi (Japan only) Colin McRae Rally (North America only) Colony Wars: Red Sun (Published by Psygnosis) Cool Boarders 2001 (North America only) Covert Ops: Nuclear Dawn (Japan and PAL only) Crash Bash Destruction Derby Raw (PAL only) Disney's Aladdin in Nasira's Revenge (Co-published with Disney Interactive in PAL and North America only) Disney's Story Studio: Mulan (Co-published with Disney Interactive in PAL only) Disney's The Emperor's New Groove (Co-published with Disney Interactive in North America and PAL only) Doko Demo Issho Tsuika Disc: Koneko Mo Issho (Japan only) (PocketStation support) Dragon Valor (Co-published with Namco in PAL only) Everybody's Golf 2 (PocketStation support) Formula One 2000 (North America and PAL only) Ghoul Panic (Co-published with Namco in PAL only) Grind Session (North America and PAL only) Jackie Chan Stuntmaster (Co-published with Radical Entertainment in PAL only) In Cold Blood (PAL only) Legend of Dragoon Magical Dice Kids (Japan only) MediEvil 2 MLB 2001 (North America only) Monster Rancher (Co-published with Tecmo in PAL only) Moto Racer World Tour (PAL only) Mr. Driller (Co-published with Namco in PAL only) Ms. Pac-Man Maze Madness (Co-published with Namco in PAL only) Muppet Monster Adventure (PAL only) Muppet RaceMania (PAL only) NBA ShootOut 2001 (North America only) NCAA Final Four 2000 (North America only) NCAA Gamebreaker 2001 (North America only) NFL GameDay 2001 (North America only) NHL FaceOff 2001 (North America only) Pac-Man World (Co-published with Namco in PAL only) Pocket Jiman (Japan only) (PocketStation support) Popolocrois Story II (Japan only) Rescue Shot (Co-published with Namco in PAL only) Rollcage Stage II (PAL only) Shachou Eiyuuden: The Eagle Shooting Heroes (Japan only) Shadow Madness (Co-published with Crave Entertainment in PAL only) Space Debris (PAL only) Spyro 2: Ripto's Rage! (PocketStation support) Spyro: Year of the Dragon Star Ixiom (Co-published with Namco in PAL only) Syphon Filter 2 (Published by 989 Studios in North America and by Sony Computer Entertainment in PAL only) Team Buddies (PAL only) Terracon (PAL only) This is Football 2 Walt Disney's The Jungle Book Groove Party (Co-published with Disney Interactive in PAL only) Who Wants to Be a Millionaire 2nd Edition (North America only) Wild 9 (Co-published with Interplay in Japan only) Wild Arms 2 (Japan and North America only) Wipeout 3: Special Edition (PAL only) 2001 

 Retail C-12: Final Resistance Disney•Pixar Monsters, Inc. Scream Team (Co-published with Disney Interactive in North America and PAL only) Disney's Atlantis: The Lost Empire (Co-published with Disney Interactive) Disney's Party Time with Winnie The Pooh (Co-published with Disney Interactive in PAL only) Disney's The Little Mermaid II (Co-published with Disney Interactive in PAL only) Formula One 2001 (PAL only) Libero Grande International (Co-published with Namco in PAL only) MLB 2002 (North America only) NCAA Final Four 2002 (North America only) NBA ShootOut 2002 (North America only) NFL GameDay 2002 (North America only) Point Blank 3 (Co-published with Namco in PAL only) Syphon Filter 3 Time Crisis: Project Titan (Co-published with Namco in PAL only) Twisted Metal: Small Brawl (North America only) Who Wants to Be a Millionaire 3rd Edition (North America only) 2002 

 Retail Alfred Chicken (PAL only) Disney's Treasure Planet (Co-published with Disney Interactive) Disney's Lilo & Stitch (Co-published with Disney Interactive) Final Fantasy VI (Co-published with Squaresoft in PAL only) Final Fantasy Anthology (Co-published with Squaresoft in PAL only) Firebugs (PAL only) Formula One Arcade (PAL only) Jim Henson's The Hoobs (PAL only) Klonoa Beach Volleyball (Co-published with Namco in PAL only) MLB 2003 (North America only) NBA ShootOut 2003 (North America only) NFL GameDay 2003 (North America only) Peter Pan in Disney's Return to Never Land (Co-published with Disney Interactive) Stuart Little 2 (North America and PAL only) WRC: FIA World Rally Championship Arcade (PAL only) 2003 

 Retail Jinx (PAL only) MLB 2004 (North America only) NBA ShootOut 2004 (North America only) NFL GameDay 2004 (North America only) 2004 

 Retail MLB 2005 (North America only) NFL GameDay 2005 (North America only) PlayStation 2 

 2000 

 Retail Bikkuri Mouse (Japan only) Blood: The Last Vampire - Gekan (Japan only) Blood: The Last Vampire - Joukan (Japan only) Dead or Alive 2 (Co-published with Tecmo in PAL only) FantaVision NCAA GameBreaker 2001 (North America only) NCAA Final Four 2001 (North America only) NFL GameDay 2001 (North America only) Ridge Racer V (Co-published with Namco in PAL only) Scandal (Japan only) Tekken Tag Tournament (Co-published with Namco in PAL only) TVDJ (Japan only) 2001 

 Retail AirBlade (PAL only) Bravo Music: Christmas Edition (Japan only) Cool Boarders 2001 (North America only) ATV Offroad Fury Dark Cloud Extermination Formula One 2001 Frequency (North America and PAL only) Genshi no Kotoba (Japan only) Gran Turismo 3: A-Spec Gran Turismo Concept Tokyo 2001 (Japan only) Gran Turismo Concept Tokyo-Geneva (PAL only) Gran Turismo Concept Tokyo-Seoul (South-Korea only) Ico Jak and Daxter: The Precursor Legacy Kinetica (North America only) Klonoa 2: Lunatea's Veil (Co-published with Namco in PAL only) Legaia 2: Duel Saga (Japan only) Mad Maestro! (Japan only) Mister Mosquito (Japan only) MotoGP  (Co-published with Namco in PAL only) NBA ShootOut 2001 (North America only) NCAA Final Four 2002 (North America only) NFL GameDay 2002 (North America only) NHL FaceOff 2001 Okage: Shadow King (North America and Japan only) PaRappa the Rapper 2 Pipo Saru 2001 (Japan only) Rimo-Cocoron (Japan only) Sagashi ni Ikouyo (Japan only) SkyGunner (Japan only) Sky Odyssey (Japan and PAL only) The Bouncer (Co-published with Squaresoft in PAL only) The Yamanote Sen: Train Simulator Real (Japan only) Time Crisis II  (Co-published with Namco in PAL only) This is Football 2002 (PAL and North America only) Tsungai: Atonement (Japan only) Twisted Metal: Black Vampire Night (Co-published with Namco in PAL only) Yoake no Mariko (Japan only) WRC 2002 

 Retail Ace Combat: Distant Thunder (Co-published with Namco in PAL only), released as Ace Combat 04: Shattered Skies in NTSC regions.
 Alpine Racer 3 (Co-published with Namco in PAL only) ATV Offroad Fury 2 (North America only) Boku no Natsuyasumi 2: Umi no Bokuen Hen (Japan only) Bravo Music: Chou-Meikyokuban (Japan only) Disney•Pixar Monsters, Inc. Scream Team (Co-published with Disney Interactive in North America and PAL only) Disney's Stitch: Experiment 626 Disney's Treasure Planet (Co-published with Disney Interactive) Drakan: The Ancients' Gates (North America and PAL only) Dropship: United Peace Front (PAL only) Dual Hearts (Japan only) Ecco the Dolphin: Defender of the Future (Co-published with Sega in PAL only) Everybody's Golf 3 (Japan and North America only) Ferrari F355 Challenge (Co-published with Sega in PAL only) Final Fantasy X (Co-published with Squaresoft in PAL only) Formula One 2002 Futari no Fantasvision (Japan only) Gacharoku (Japan only) Headhunter (Co-published with Sega in PAL only) Jet X20 (North America only) Kingdom Hearts (Co-published with Squaresoft in PAL only) Let's Bravo Music (Japan only) MotoGP 2  (Co-published with Namco in PAL only) NBA ShootOut 2003 (North America only) NCAA Final Four 2003 (North America only) NCAA Gamebreaker 2003 (North America only) NFL GameDay 2003 (North America only) NHL FaceOff 2003 (North America only) Ninja Assault (Co-published with Namco in PAL only) Otostaz (Japan only) Peter Pan in Disney's Return to Never Land (Co-published with Disney Interactive) Poinie's Poin (Japan only) Popolocrois: Adventure of Beginnings (Japan only) Ratchet & Clank Rez (Co-published with Sega in PAL only) Sly Cooper and the Thievius Raccoonus Smash Court Tennis Pro Tournament (Co-published with Namco in PAL only) SOCOM U.S. Navy SEALs Space Channel 5 (Co-published with Sega in PAL only) Space Fishermen (Japan only) Surveillance Kanshisha (Japan only) Tekken 4 (Co-published with Namco in PAL only) The Getaway The Keihin Kyuukou: Train Simulator Real (Japan only) The Mark of Kri (North America and PAL only) This is Football 2003 Twisted Metal: Black Online Virtua Fighter 4 (Co-published with Sega in PAL only) Yoake no Mariko 2nd Act (Japan only) Wild Arms 3 (Japan and North America only) Wipeout Fusion WRC II Extreme XI Go (Japan only) 2003 

 Retail Amplitude (North America and PAL only) Ape Escape 2 (Japan and PAL only) Arc the Lad: Twilight of the Spirits Dark Chronicle Deka Voice (Japan only) Dog's Life (PAL only) Downhill Domination (North America and Japan only) EverQuest Online Adventures (Published by Sony Online Entertainment in North America and by Sony Computer Entertainment in PAL only) EverQuest Online Adventures: Frontiers (Published by Sony Online Entertainment in North America only) EyeToy: Play EyeToy: Groove Flipnic: Ultimate Pinball (Japan only) Formula One 2003 Gacharoku 2: Kondo wa Sekai Isshuu yo!! (Japan only) Ghosthunter (PAL only) Hardware: Online Arena (PAL and Korea only) Jak II Kuma Uta (Japan only) Lifeline (Japan only) Jampack Winter 2003 (North America only) MLB 2004 (Published in North America and Japan only) Mojib-Ribbon (Japan only) MotoGP 3  (Co-published with Namco in PAL only) My Street (North America and PAL only) NBA ShootOut 2004 (North America only) NCAA Final Four 2004 (North America only) NFL GameDay 2004 (North America only) Pac-Man World 2 (Co-published with Namco in PAL only) Primal Ratchet & Clank: Going Commando Shibai Michi (Japan only) Shinobi (Co-published with Sega in PAL only) SOCOM II U.S. Navy SEALs Space Channel 5: Part 2 (Co-published with Sega in PAL only, except UK) This is Football 2004 (PAL and North America only) Time Crisis 3  (Co-published with Namco in PAL only) War of the Monsters WRC 3 2004 

 Retail Arc the Lad: End of Darkness (Japan only) Ape Escape: Pumped & Primed Athens 2004 ATV Offroad Fury 3 (North America only) Bakufuu Slash! Kizna Arashi (Japan only) Champions of Norrath: Realms of EverQuest (Published by Sony Online Entertainment in North America only) Crisis Zone (Co-published with Namco in PAL only) Destruction Derby: Arenas DJbox (Japan only) DJ: Decks & FX (PAL only) Doko Demo Issho: Toro to Nagare Boshi (Japan only) Everybody's Golf 4 EyeToy: Antigrav (North America and PAL only) EyeToy: Monkey Mania (Japan and PAL only) EyeToy: Play 2 (North America and PAL only) Final Fantasy XI (Co-published with Square-Enix in North America only) Finny the Fish & the Seven Waters (Japan only) Formula One 04 Gran Turismo 4: Prologue Gretzky NHL 2005 (North America only) I-Ninja (Co-published with Namco in PAL only) Jackie Chan Adventures (PAL only) Jak 3 Jet Li: Rise to Honor Kill.Switch (Co-published with Namco in PAL only) Killzone Koufuku Sousakan (Japan only) MLB 2005 (Published in North America and Japan only) Popolocrois:Adventure of the Law of the Moon (Japan only) Pride of the Dragon Peace (Japan only) Prince of Persia: Jikan no Suna (Co-published with Ubisoft in Japan only) Ratchet & Clank: Up Your Arsenal SingStar (PAL only) SingStar Party (PAL only) Siren Sly 2: Band of Thieves Smash Court Tennis Pro Tournament 2 (Co-published with Namco in PAL only) Soulcalibur III (Co-published with Namco in PAL only) Syphon Filter: The Omega Strain The Getaway: Black Monday This is Football 2004 (PAL and North America only) This is Football 2005 (PAL and North America only) Vib-Ripple (Japan only) WRC 4 2005 

 Retail Ace Combat:Squadron Leader (Co-published with Namco in PAL only) Ape Escape 3 Bokura no Kazoku (Japan only) Brave: The Search for Spirit Dancer (Co-published with VIS Entertainment in PAL only) Buzz!: The Music Quiz Champions: Return to Arms (Published by Sony Online Entertainment in North America only) Death by Degrees (Co-published with Namco in PAL only) Disney's Peter Pan: The Legend of Never Land (Co-published with Disney Interactive in PAL only) EyeToy: Chat (PAL only) EyeToy: EduKids (Asia only) EyeToy: Kinetic (North America and PAL only) EyeToy: Play 3 (PAL only) Formula One 05 Gaelic Games: Football (PAL only) Genji: Dawn of the Samurai God of War (North America and PAL only) Gran Turismo 4 Gretzky NHL 06 (North America only) Jak X: Combat Racing (North America and PAL only) Kenran Butou Sai: The Mars Daybreak (Japan only) Mawaza (Japan only) MLB 2006 (Published in North America only) MotoGP 4  (Co-published with Namco in PAL only) NBA 06 (North America only) Neopets: The Darkest Faerie (North America only) Ratchet: Deadlocked Rise of the Kasai (North America only) Roland Garros Paris 2005:Powered by Smash Court Tennis (Co-published with Namco in PAL only) Shadow of the Colossus SingStar '80s SingStar Pop SingStar The Dome (PAL only) Sly 3: Honor Among Thieves SOCOM 3 U.S. Navy SEALs Soul Calibur 3 (Co-published with Namco) SpyToy (North America and PAL only) Stuart Little 3: Big Photo Mode Adventure (PAL only) Tekken 5 (Co-published with Namco in PAL only) Wild Arms 4 (Japan only) Wild Arms Alter Code: F (Japan only) WRC: Rally Evolved (PAL only) Xenosaga Episode II: Jenseits von Gut und böse (Co-published with Namco in PAL only) 2006 

 Retail 24: The Game (PAL only) Ace Combat Zero: The Belkan War (Co-published with Bandai Namco Games in PAL only) Ape Escape: Million Monkeys (Japan only) ATV Offroad Fury 4 B-Boy (PAL only) Blood+ Souyoku no Battle Rondo (Japan only) Brave Story: Wataru no Bouken (Japan only) Buzz!: The Big Quiz Buzz!: The Sports Quiz (PAL only) Buzz! Junior: Jungle Party EyeToy: Kinetic Combat (PAL only) EyeToy: Play Sports (PAL only) Forbidden Siren 2 (Japan and PAL only) Formula One 06 Gran Turismo 4 Online test version (Japan only) Gunparade Orchestra: Ao no Shou (Japan only) Gunparade Orchestra: Midori no Shou (Japan only) Gunparade Orchestra: Shiro no Shou (Japan only) Lemmings (PAL only) MLB 06: The Show (North America and Korea only) NBA 07 (North America only) Rule of Rose (Japan only) Shinobido: Way of the Ninja (PAL only) SingStar Anthems (PAL only) SingStar Legends SingStar Rocks! SOCOM U.S. Navy SEALs: Combined Assault Tourist Trophy Urban Reign (Co-published with Namco in PAL only) Wild Arms 5 (Japan only) 2007 

 Retail Buzz!: The Hollywood Quiz Buzz! The Mega Quiz Buzz! Junior: Monster Rumble Buzz! Junior: Robo Jam Everybody's Tennis EyeToy Astro Zoo (PAL only) Gaelic Games: Football 2 (PAL only) Gaelic Games: Hurling (PAL only) God of War II (North America and PAL only) MLB 07: The Show (North America and Korea only) NBA 08 (North America and Australia only) Rogue Galaxy SingStar '90s SingStar Amped (North America and Australia only) SingStar Pop Hits 2 (PAL only) SingStar Rock Ballads (PAL only) SingStar R&B (PAL only) Syphon Filter: Dark Mirror 2008 

 Retail Buzz!: The Pop Quiz Buzz!: The Schools Quiz Buzz! Junior: Ace Racers (PAL only) Buzz! Junior: Dino Den (PAL only) EyeToy Play: Hero (PAL only) EyeToy Play: PomPom Party (PAL only) MLB 08: The Show (North America only) NBA 09: The Inside (North America only) Ratchet & Clank: Size Matters SingStar ABBA SingStar BoyBands vs GirlBands SingStar Country (North America only) SingStar Hottest Hits (Australia only) SingStar Party Hits (Australia only) SingStar Pop Vol. 2 (North America only) SingStar Singalong with Disney (PAL only) SingStar Summer Party (PAL only) Twisted Metal: Head-On: Extra Twisted Edition (North America only) 2009 

 Retail Buzz!: Brain of the World (PAL only) Cart Kings (India only) Chandragupta: Warrior Prince (India only) Desi Adda: Games of India (India only) Ghostbusters: The Video Game (PAL only) Hanuman: Boy Warrior (India only) Jak and Daxter: The Lost Frontier (North America and PAL only) MLB 09: The Show (North America only) MotorStorm: Arctic Edge Secret Agent Clank (North America and PAL only) SingStar Latino (North America only) SingStar Motown SingStar Queen SingStar Take That (UK only) SingStar Vasco (Italy only) Wipeout Pulse (PAL only) 2010 

 Retail MLB 10: The Show (North America and Korea only) SingStar Chart Hits (Australia Only) SingStar Wiggles (Australia only) Street Cricket Champions (India only) Syphon Filter: Logan's Shadow (North America only) 2011 

 Retail Chandragupta: Warrior Prince (India only) MLB 11: The Show (North America and Korea only) RA. ONE: The Game (India only) 2012 

 Retail Street Cricket Champions 2 (India only) 2013 

 Retail DON 2 The Game (India only) PlayStation 3 

 2006 

 Retail Genji: Days of the Blade NBA 07 (North America and Japan only) Resistance: Fall of Man Untold Legends: Dark Kingdom (Published by Sony Online Entertainment) PlayStation Network Blast Factor Cash Guns Chaos DLX (Published by Sony Online Entertainment in North America only) Go! Sudoku Gran Turismo HD Concept Lemmings Mainichi Issho (Japan only) 2007 

 Retail Boku no Natsuyasumi 3: Kitaguni Hen: Chiisana Boku no Dai Sougen (Japan only) Folklore Formula One Championship Edition Heavenly Sword Lair MLB 07: The Show (North America and Korea only) MotorStorm NBA 08 (North America and PAL only) Ratchet & Clank Future: Tools of Destruction Ridge Racer 7 (Co-published with Namco in PAL only) SingStar The Eye of Judgment Uncharted: Drake's Fortune Warhawk PlayStation Network Aqua Vita (North America and PAL only) Calling All Cars! Everyday Shooter EyeCreate Feel Ski Flow Go! Puzzle High Stakes on the Vegas Strip: Poker Edition (Published by Sony Online Entertainment in North America and PAL only) High Velocity Bowling LocoRoco Cocoreccho! Mesmerize Distort (North America and PAL only) Mesmerize Trace (North America and PAL only) Nucleus Operation Creature Feature (North America and PAL only)
 Pain (Retail version in PAL only) PixelJunk Racers (North America and PAL only) Piyotama Snakeball Super Rub 'a' Dub Super Stardust HD Tekken 5: Dark Resurrection (Co-published with Namco Bandai Games in PAL only) The Trials of Topoq Tori Emaki Toy Home Game Archives 2Xtreme (North America only) Alundra (Japan only) Bealphareth (Japan only) Cool Boarders (North America and PAL only)
 Crash Bandicoot Crime Crackers (Japan only) Crime Crackers 2 (Japan only) Depth (Japan only) Destruction Derby Everybody's Golf 2 Panekit (Japan only) Ganbare Morikawa Kimi 2nd Pet in TV (Japan only) Global Force - Shin Sentō Kokka (Japan only) Gunners Heaven (Japan only) I.Q.: Intelligent Qube (Japan only) Jumping Flash! MediEvil Ore no Ryōri (Japan only) Ore no Shikabane o Koete Yuke (Japan only) Philosoma (Japan only) PoPoLoCrois Monogatari (Japan only) PoPoLoCrois Monogatari II (Japan only) PoPoLoGue (Japan only) Robbit mon Dieu (Japan only) Saru! Get You! (Japan only) Syphon Filter (North America and PAL only)
 Tiny Bullets (Japan only) TomaRunner (Japan only) Twisted Metal 2 (North America and Japan only) Velldeselba Senki: Tsubasa no Kunshō (Japan only) Wipeout XI sai (Japan only) XI Jumbo (Japan only) 2008 

 Retail Afrika (Japan only) Aquanaut's Holiday: Hidden Memories (Japan only) Buzz!: Quiz TV Gran Turismo 5 Prologue Everybody's Golf 5 LittleBigPlanet MLB 08: The Show (North America and Korea only) MotorStorm: Pacific Rift NBA 09: The Inside (North America only) Resistance 2 SingStar ABBA SingStar Vol. 2 SingStar Vol. 3 SOCOM U.S. Navy SEALs: Confrontation Time Crisis 4 (Co-published with Namco in PAL only) PlayStation Network Buzz! Junior: Jungle Party (PAL and North America only) Crash Commando Dark Mist Echochrome Elefunk Linger in Shadows PixelJunk Eden (North America and PAL only) PixelJunk Monsters (North America and PAL only) PlayStation Home Ratchet & Clank Future: Quest for Booty (Retail version in PAL only) Siren: Blood Curse (Retail version in PAL only) Sky Diving The Last Guy Wipeout HD Game Archives Addie no Okurimono: To Moze from Addie (Japan only) Crash Bandicoot 2: Cortex Strikes Back Crash Bandicoot Carnival (Japan only) Crash Bandicoot: Warped Dig-a-Dig Pukka (Japan only) Docchi Mecha! (Japan only) Jet Moto Jet Moto 2 (North America and PAL only) Jet Moto 3 (North America only) Linda³ Again (Japan only) Magical Dice Kids (Japan only) Syphon Filter 3 (North America and PAL only) 2009 

 Retail Buzz!: Brain of the World (PAL only) Buzz!: Quiz World Demon's Souls (Japan only) Desi Adda: Games of India (India only) EyePet (PAL only) Ghostbusters: The Video Game (PAL only) God of War Collection (North America and PAL only) Infamous Killzone 2 MLB 09: The Show (North America, Korea and Australia only) Ratchet & Clank Future: A Crack in Time SingStar Latino (North America only) SingStar Motown (PAL only) SingStar Queen SingStar Pop Edition (PAL only) SingStar Starter Pack (PAL only) SingStar Take That (UK only) SingStar Vasco (Italy only) Toro to Morimori (Japan only) Uncharted 2: Among Thieves Wipeout HD Fury (PAL only) PlayStation Network .detuned Bejeweled 2 (Published by Sony Online Entertainment in North America and PAL only) Buzz! Junior: Dino Den (PAL only) Buzz! Junior: Monster Rumble (PAL and North America only) Buzz! Junior: Robo Jam (PAL and North America only) Dress (Japan only) Fat Princess Flower Gravity Crash GTI Club+: Rally Côte d'Azur (North America only) Heavy Weapon (Published by Sony Online Entertainment in North America and PAL only) Hustle Kings Magic Orbz (North America only) Numblast Peggle (Published by Sony Online Entertainment in North America and PAL only) Peggle Nights (Published by Sony Online Entertainment in North America and PAL only) PixelJunk Shooter (North America and PAL only) Rag Doll Kung Fu: Fists of Plastic Revenge of the Wounded Dragons (North America only) Savage Moon Switchball (Published by Sony Online Entertainment in North America and PAL only) The Punisher: No Mercy Trash Panic Zuma (Published by Sony Online Entertainment in North America and PAL only) Game Archives Cool Boarders 2 (North America and PAL only) Cool Boarders 3 (North America only) Jumping Flash! 2 (North America and Japan only) Kula World (Japan and PAL only) Rapid Racer (Japan only) Syphon Filter 2 (North America and PAL only) Wild Arms 2 (North America and Japan only) 2010 

 Retail Beat Sketcher Buzz!: The Ultimate Music Quiz (PAL only) EyePet Move Edition God of War III Gran Turismo 5 Heavy Rain Heavy Rain Move Edition High Velocity Bowling Move Edition (North America and Japan only) Kung Fu Rider Mag MLB 10: The Show (North America and Korea only) ModNation Racers SingStar Chart Hits (Australia only) SingStar Dance SingStar Guitar (PAL only) The Sly Collection Sports Champions Start the Party! The Fight: Lights Out The Shoot Time Crisis: Razing Storm (Co-published with Namco in PAL only) TV Superstars White Knight Chronicles PlayStation Network Buzz!: Quiz Player (PAL only, free-to-play version) Dead Nation Eat Them! echochrome ii Feeding Frenzy 2: Shipwreck Showdown (Published by Sony Online Entertainment in North America and PAL only) MotorStorm 3D Rift PixelJunk Racers: 2nd Lap (North America and PAL only) Qlione Evolve (Published by Sony Online Entertainment in North America and PAL only) Sackboy's Prehistoric Moves SingStar Viewer Swords & Soldiers (Published by Sony Online Entertainment in North America and PAL only) TerRover (Published by Sony Online Entertainment in North America and PAL only) Top Darts Tumble Game Archives 40 Winks (PAL only) Arc Arena: Monster Tournament (North America and Japan only) Arc the Lad (North America and Japan only) Arc the Lad II (North America and Japan only) Crash Team Racing Critical Depth (PAL only) Gunparade March (Japan only) Kurushi Final (PAL only) 2011 

 Retail Bleach: Soul Resurrecciòn (Japan only) Carnival Island DC Universe Online DanceStar Party (PAL and North America only) EyePet & Friends God of War: Origins Collection Infamous 2 Killzone 3 LittleBigPlanet 2 Medieval Moves: Deadmund's Quest MLB 11: The Show (North America, Korea and Australia only) MotorStorm: Apocalypse (PAL and North America only) Move Fitness (Retail version in PAL, Asia and Korea, only download in North America) PlayStation Move Ape Escape (Retail version in Japan, Asia and PAL, only download in North America and UK) PlayStation Move Heroes Ratchet & Clank: All 4 One Resistance 3 SingStar Back to the '80s (PAL only) SOCOM 4 Start the Party! Save the World (Retail version in PAL and Asia only) Tekken Hybrid (Co-published with Namco Bandai Games in PAL only) The Ico & Shadow of the Colossus Collection Uncharted 3: Drake's Deception White Knight Chronicles 2 PlayStation Network Acceleration of Suguri X Edition (Published by Sony Online Entertainment) Akimi Village (Published by Sony Online Entertainment in North America and PAL only) DC Universe Online (Published by Sony Online Entertainment, free-to-play version) Free Realms (Published by Sony Online Entertainment in North and PAL only) Infamous: Festival of Blood Payday: The Heist (Published by Sony Online Entertainment in North America and PAL only) PixelJunk Shooter 2 (North America and PAL only) PixelJunk SideScroller (North America and PAL only) Plants vs. Zombies (Published by Sony Online Entertainment in North America and PAL only) RA. ONE: The Game (PAL only, retail version in India only) Rochard (Published by Sony Online Entertainment in North America and PAL only) Sideway New York (Published by Sony Online Entertainment in North America and PAL only) Slam Bolt Scrappers (Published by Sony Online Entertainment in North America and PAL only) Game Archives Arc the Lad III (North America and Japan only) Fire Panic (Japan only) Motor Toon Grand Prix Nightmare Creatures (Japan only) Rally Cross (Japan and PAL only) 2012 

 Retail DanceStar Party Hits (PAL only) God of War Saga (North America only) Jak and Daxter Collection Journey Collector's Edition Killzone Trilogy LittleBigPlanet Karting MLB 12: The Show (North America, Korea and Australia only) PlayStation All-Stars Battle Royale Ratchet & Clank Collection Ratchet & Clank: Full Frontal Assault Sorcery Sports Champions 2 Starhawk Twisted Metal Wonderbook: Book of Spells (PAL and North America only) PlayStation Network Datura Journey Killzone (Remastered version) Killzone 3 Multiplayer Malicious MotorStorm RC Move Street Cricket (PAL only, retail version in India only) PixelJunk 4am (North America and PAL only) SingStar (Free-to-play version) Sound Shapes The Unfinished Swan Tokyo Jungle (Retail version in Japan only) When Vikings Attack! Game Archives Dark Cloud (Japan only) Gacharoku (Japan only) Primal (North America only) Spyro the Dragon Spyro 2: Ripto's Rage! Spyro: Year of the Dragon (North America and PAL only) Suzuki TT Superbikes Real Road Racing Championship (North America only) Syphon Filter: The Omega Strain (North America only) The Legend of Dragoon (North America and Japan only) UmJammer Lammy War of the Monsters (North America only) Warhawk Wild Arms 2013 

 Retail Beyond: Two Souls God of War: Ascension Gran Turismo 6 Invizimals: The Lost Kingdom (Retail version in PAL only, download only in North America) MLB 13: The Show (Retail version in North America, Korea and Australia, download only in PAL) Puppeteer Ratchet & Clank: Into the Nexus Sly Cooper: Thieves in Time The Last of Us Wonderbook: Book of Potions (PAL and North America only) Wonderbook: Diggs Nightcrawler (PAL and North America only) Wonderbook: Walking with Dinosaurs (PAL and North America only) PlayStation Network Bentley's Hackpack DanceStar Digital (PAL only, free-to-play version) Dare to Fly (PAL only) Doki-Doki Universe Dust 514 Everybody's Golf 6 (Retail version in Japan only) Kite Fight (PAL only) Move Street Cricket II (PAL only, retail version in India only) Pro Foosball Rain (Retail version in Japan only) Ratchet: Deadlocked (Remastered version) Uncharted 3: Drake's Deception Multiplayer Free-to-play Game Archives Doko Demo Issho (Japan only) Doko Demo Issho Tsuika Disc: Koneko Mo Issyo (Japan only) Finny the Fish & the Seven Waters (Japan only) Rebel Raiders: Operation Nighthawk (North America only) Riding Star (North America only) Siren (North America and Japan only) Space Fishermen (Japan only) The Mark of Kri (North America only) The Red Star (North America only) Twisted Metal (North America and PAL only) Twisted Metal: Black (North America and PAL only) Ultimate Board Game Collection (North America only) 2014 

 Retail LittleBigPlanet 3 Minecraft MLB 14: The Show (Retail version in North America, download only in PAL) Ratchet & Clank: Ginga Saikyo Tristar Pack (Japan only) PlayStation Network CounterSpy Entwined Hohokum Pain (Free-to-play version) Resogun SingStar Game Archives Ape Escape 3 (Japan only) Arc the Lad: Twilight of the Spirits (Japan only) Brightis (Japan only) Pocket Jiman (Japan only) Pocket MūMū (Japan only) Rogue Galaxy (Japan only) Soukou Kihei Armodyne (Japan only) Vib-Ribbon Wild Arms 5 (Japan only) 2015 

 Retail Call of Duty: Black Ops III (Published by Sony Computer Entertainment in Japan only) MLB 15: The Show PlayStation Network Helldivers Game Archives Doko Demo Issho: Watashi Naehon (Japan only) Dual Hearts (Japan only) Ka 2: Let's Go Hawaii (Japan only) Legaia 2: Duel Saga (Japan only) Mad Maestro! (Japan only) Sagashi ni Ikouyo (Japan only) 2016 

 Retail MLB The Show 16 PlayStation 4 

 2013 

 Retail Killzone: Shadow Fall Knack PlayStation Network DC Universe Online (Published by Sony Online Entertainment) Doki-Doki Universe Escape Plan Flow Flower Resogun Sound Shapes The Playroom 2014 

 Retail Destiny (Published by Sony Computer Entertainment in Japan only) Driveclub Infamous First Light (Retail version in PAL, download only in North America) Infamous Second Son LittleBigPlanet 3 Minecraft MLB 14: The Show (Retail version in North America, download only in PAL) The Last of Us Remastered PlayStation Network CounterSpy Dead Nation: Apocalypse Edition Entwined Hohokum Killzone: Shadow Fall Intercept (Standalone version) SingStar The Unfinished Swan 2015 

 Retail Bloodborne Call of Duty: Black Ops III (Published by Sony Computer Entertainment in Japan only) God of War III Remastered Helldivers: Super-Earth Ultimate Edition Journey Collector's Edition MLB 15: The Show (Retail version in North America, download only in PAL) Tearaway Unfolded The Order: 1886 Uncharted: The Nathan Drake Collection Until Dawn PlayStation Network Beyond: Two Souls Destiny: The Taken King (Published by Sony Computer Entertainment in Japan only) Driveclub Bikes (Standalone version) Everybody's Gone to the Rapture Fat Princess Adventures Guns Up! Helldivers Hustle Kings Journey Ultra Street Fighter IV (Published by Sony Computer Entertainment outside Japan) Super Stardust Ultra The Last of Us: Left Behind (Standalone version) Classics Catalog Dark Cloud (North America and PAL only) FantaVision (North America and PAL only) PaRappa the Rapper 2 (North America and PAL only) Rogue Galaxy (North America and PAL only) The Mark of Kri (North America and PAL only) Twisted Metal: Black (North America and PAL only) War of the Monsters (North America and PAL only) 2016 

 Retail Call of Duty: Modern Warfare Remastered (Published by Sony Interactive Entertainment in Japan) Call of Duty: Infinite Warfare (Published by Sony Interactive Entertainment in Japan) Gravity Rush Remastered Here They Lie (Retail version in PAL, download only in North America) (PlayStation VR support) MLB The Show 16 No Man's Sky (Co-published with Hello Games in PAL only)
 Paragon Essentials Edition (Retail version) Ratchet & Clank Shadow of the Beast (Retail version in Asia, download only in PAL and North America)
 The Heavy Rain & Beyond: Two Souls Collection The Last Guardian Uncharted: Drake's Fortune Remastered (Retail version in PAL, download only in North America) Uncharted 2: Among Thieves Remastered (Retail version in PAL, download only in North America) Uncharted 3: Drake's Deception Remastered (Retail version in PAL, download only in North America) Uncharted 4: A Thief's End PlayStation Network Alienation Bound (PlayStation VR support) Hardware: Rivals Heavy Rain Kill Strain The Tomorrow Children Classics Catalog Ape Escape 2 (North America and PAL only) Arc the Lad: Twilight of the Spirits (North America and PAL only) Dark Chronicle (North America and PAL only) Everybody's Tennis (North America and PAL only) Kinetica (North America and PAL only) Okage: Shadow King (North America and PAL only) Primal (North America and PAL only) Rise of the Kasai (North America and PAL only) Siren (North America and PAL only) Wild Arms 3 (North America and PAL only) PlayStation VR Battlezone (Retail version) Call of Duty: Infinite Warfare Jackal Assault VR Experience (Published by Sony Interactive Entertainment in Japan) Driveclub VR Eve: Valkyrie (Retail version) Hustle Kings VR (Retail version in PAL, download only in North America) Joysound VR (Japan only) PlayStation VR Worlds RIGS: Mechanized Combat League Robinson: The Journey (Retail version) Super Stardust Ultra VR (Retail version in PAL, download only in North America) The Playroom VR (Download only) Tumble VR (Download only) Until Dawn: Rush of Blood 2017 

 Retail Call of Duty: WWII (Published by Sony Interactive Entertainment in Japan only) Crash Bandicoot N. Sane Trilogy (Published by Sony Interactive Entertainment in Japan only) Destiny 2 (Published by Sony Interactive Entertainment in Japan only) Gran Turismo Sport (PlayStation VR support) Gravity Rush 2 Horizon Zero Dawn Knack II MLB The Show 17 Everybody's Golf Matterfall (Retail version in PAL, download only in North America) Nioh (Published by Sony Interactive Entertainment outside Japan) Uncharted: The Lost Legacy Wipeout Omega Collection PlayStation Network Drawn to Death Jak and Daxter Bundle (North America and PAL only) LocoRoco Remastered LocoRoco 2 Remastered Malicious Fallen (Published by Sony Interactive Entertainment outside Japan) PaRappa the Rapper Remastered Patapon Remastered Stifled Classics Catalog Jak and Daxter: The Precursor Legacy Jak II Jak 3 PlayStation VR Air Force Special Ops: Nightfall (Download only) Farpoint Honkowa Presents: Nogizaka46 VR Horror House (only available in Japan) Japan Studio VR Music Festival (only available in Japan) Joshua Bell VR Experience (Download only) Kamen Rider Ex-Aid: Maboroshiyume VR (only available in Japan) Kamen Rider Ex-Aid: True Ending (only available in Japan) No Heroes Allowed! VR (Retail version in Asia, download only internationally) StarBlood Arena The Last Guardian VR Demo (Download only) The Virtual Orchestra (Download only) PlayLink Hidden Agenda Knowledge is Power SingStar Celebration That's You! 2018 

 Retail Call of Duty: Black Ops 4 (Published by Sony Interactive Entertainment in Japan only) Detroit: Become Human God of War Marvel's Spider-Man MLB The Show 18 Quantic Dream Collection (North America only) Shadow of the Colossus Tetris Effect (Retail Version) Wipeout Omega Collection (PlayStation VR support) PlayStation Network World of Warriors Classics Catalog Jak X: Combat Racing PlayStation VR Animal Force (published by SIE outside North America) Astro Bot Rescue Mission Bravo Team Creed: Rise to Glory (Retail Version) Déraciné Firewall: Zero Hour Theater Room VR (Japan only) The Detective invisible (Japan only) The Inpatient Track Lab PlayLink Chimparty Frantics Knowledge is Power: Decades 2019 

 Retail Call of Duty: Modern Warfare (Published by Sony Interactive Entertainment in Japan only) Concrete Genie (PlayStation VR support) Days Gone Death Stranding MediEvil MLB The Show 19 Monkey King: Hero Is Back (Published by Sony Interactive Entertainment in Asia only) PlayStation Network Dreams (Early Access) Erica ReadySet Heroes PlayStation VR Blood & Truth Everybody's Golf VR Hikaru Utada Laughter in the Dark Tour 2018 (Download only) Immortal Legacy: The Jade Cipher 2020 

 Retail Call of Duty: Black Ops Cold War (Published by Sony Interactive Entertainment in Japan) Dreams (PlayStation VR support) Ghost of Tsushima Marvel's Spider-Man: Miles Morales MLB The Show 20 Nioh 2 (Published by Sony Interactive Entertainment outside Asia) Predator: Hunting Grounds Sackboy: A Big Adventure The Last of Us Part II PlayStation Network Patapon 2 Remastered PlayStation VR Marvel's Iron Man VR Tilt Brush 2021 

 Retail Call of Duty: Vanguard (Published by Sony Interactive Entertainment in Japan) Ghost of Tsushima Director's Cut MLB The Show 21 PlayStation Network Ghost of Tsushima: Legends 2022 

 Retail God of War Ragnarök Gran Turismo 7 Horizon Forbidden West MLB The Show 22 Classics Catalog Ape Escape Echochrome Echoshift Everybody's Golf I.Q.: Intelligent Qube Jumping Flash! Kingdom of Paradise LocoRoco Midnight Carnival No Heroes Allowed! Pinball Heroes Syphon Filter Syphon Filter 2 Wild Arms 2023 

 Classics Catalog Ape Academy 2 Everybody's Golf 2 Super Stardust Portable Syphon Filter 3 Syphon Filter: Dark Mirror The Legend of Dragoon Wild Arms 2 Announced for 2023 

 Retail Convallaria (video game) MLB The Show 23 To be announced 

 Retail Lost Soul Aside PlayStation 5 

 2020 

 Retail Demon's Souls Call of Duty: Black Ops Cold War (Published by Sony Interactive Entertainment in Japan) Sackboy: A Big Adventure Marvel's Spider-Man: Miles Morales PlayStation Network Astro's Playroom Marvel's Spider-Man Remastered 2021 

 Retail Destruction AllStars The Nioh Collection (Published by Sony Interactive Entertainment outside Japan) MLB The Show 21 Returnal Ratchet & Clank: Rift Apart Ghost of Tsushima Director's Cut Death Stranding Director's Cut Call of Duty: Vanguard (Published by Sony Interactive Entertainment in Japan) PlayStation Network Nioh Remastered (Published by Sony Interactive Entertainment outside Japan) Nioh 2 Remastered (Published by Sony Interactive Entertainment outside Japan) Ghost of Tsushima: Legends 2022 

 Retail God of War Ragnarök Gran Turismo 7 Horizon Forbidden West MLB The Show 22 The Last of Us Part I Uncharted: Legacy of Thieves Collection Classics Catalog Ape Escape Echochrome Echoshift Everybody's Golf I.Q.: Intelligent Qube Jumping Flash! Kingdom of Paradise LocoRoco Midnight Carnival No Heroes Allowed! Pinball Heroes Super Stardust Portable Syphon Filter Syphon Filter 2 Wild Arms 2023 

 Retail Gran Turismo 7 (PlayStation VR2 support) PlayStation VR2 Horizon Call of the Mountain (Download only) Classics Catalog Ape Academy 2 Everybody's Golf 2 Syphon Filter 3 Syphon Filter: Dark Mirror The Legend of Dragoon Wild Arms 2 Announced for 2023 

 Retail Convallaria (video game) Marvel's Spider-Man 2 MLB The Show 23 Stellar Blade PlayStation VR2 Firewall Ultra Announced for 2024 

 Retail Rise of the Ronin To be announced 

 Retail Death Stranding 2 Lost Soul Aside Marvel's Wolverine Star Wars: Knights of the Old Republic Remake PlayStation Portable 

 2004 

 Retail Doko Demo Issho (Japan only) 2005 

 Retail Ape Escape Academy Ape Escape: On the Loose Archer Maclean's Mercury (Japan only) ATV Offroad Fury: Blazin' Trails (North America only) Everybody's Golf Portable F1 Grand Prix Fired Up Glorace: Phantastic Carnival (South Korea only) Go! Sudoku (Japan and PAL only) Gretzky NHL (North America only) Gretzky NHL 06 (North America only) Hand Dic (South Korea only) MediEvil: Resurrection MLB (North America and South Korea only) MLB 2006 (North America only) Namco Museum Battle Collection (Co-published with Namco in PAL only) NBA (North America only) NBA 06 (North America only) PoPoLoCrois (Japan only) Pursuit Force (PAL and North America only) Ridge Racer (Co-published with Namco in PAL only) SOCOM U.S. Navy SEALs: Fireteam Bravo The Con (North America, South Korea and PAL only) Twisted Metal: Head-On Untold Legends: Brotherhood of the Blade (Published by Sony Online Entertainment in North America only) Wipeout Pure World Tour Soccer: Challenge Edition WRC: FIA World Rally Championship (PAL only) Work Time Fun (Japan only) 2006 

 Retail Ace Combat X: Skies of Deception (Co-published with Namco in PAL only) Ape Escape Academy 2 (Japan and PAL only) Ape Escape Racing (Japan and Asia only) ATV Offroad Fury Pro B-Boy (PAL only) Blade Dancer: Lineage of Light (Japan only) Blood+ Final Piece (Japan only) Blood: The Last Vampire (Japan only) Boku no Natsuyasumi (Japan only) Brave Story (Japan only) Daxter Field Commander (Published by Sony Online Entertainment in North America only) Formula One 06 (Japan and PAL only) Gangs of London Killzone: Liberation Kingdom of Paradise Lemmings LocoRoco Mercury Meltdown (Japan only) MLB 06: The Show (North America and Japan only) Monster Kingdom: Jewel Summoner (Japan only) MotoGP (Co-published with Namco in PAL only) NBA 07 (North America only) Neopets: Petpet Adventures: The Wand of Wishing (North America only) Passport to... Amsterdam (PAL only) Passport to... Barcelona (PAL only) Passport to... London (PAL only) Passport to... Paris (PAL only) Passport to... Prague (PAL only) Passport to... Rome (PAL only) Ridge Racer 2 (Co-published with Namco in PAL only) SOCOM U.S. Navy SEALs: Fireteam Bravo 2 Syphon Filter: Dark Mirror Talkman Tekken: Dark Resurrection (Co-published with Namco Bandai Games in PAL only) Tenchi no Mon 2: Busouden (Japan only) Untold Legends: The Warrior's Code (Published by Sony Online Entertainment in North America only) World Tour Soccer 06 XI Coliseum (Japan only) Game Archives Global Force - Shin Sentō Kokka (Japan only) TomaRunner (Japan only) 2007 

 Retail Ape Escape: SaruSaru Big Mission (Japan only) Jeanne d'Arc (Japan and North America only) MLB 07: The Show (North America and South Korea only) NBA 08 (North America only) PaRappa the Rapper Pursuit Force: Extreme Justice (PAL and North America only) Ratchet & Clank: Size Matters Rezel Cross (Japan only) Shinobido: Tales of the Ninja (Japan and PAL only) Smash Court Tennis 3 (Co-published with Namco in PAL only) SOCOM U.S. Navy SEALs: Tactical Strike Syphon Filter: Logan's Shadow What Did I Do to Deserve This, My Lord? (Japan only) Wild Arms XF (Japan only) Wipeout Pulse PlayStation Network Ape Quest (Retail version in Japan only) Beats Go! Puzzle Syphon Filter: Combat Ops Game Archives 2Xtreme (North America only) Alundra (Japan only) Bealphareth (Japan only) Cool Boarders (North America and PAL only)
 Crash Bandicoot Crime Crackers (Japan only) Crime Crackers 2 (Japan only) Depth (Japan only) Destruction Derby Everybody's Golf 2 Panekit (Japan only) Ganbare Morikawa Kimi 2nd Pet in TV (Japan only) Gunners Heaven (Japan only) I.Q.: Intelligent Qube (Japan only) Jumping Flash! MediEvil Ore no Ryōri (Japan only) Ore no Shikabane o Koete Yuke (Japan only) Philosoma (Japan only) PoPoLoCrois Monogatari (Japan only) PoPoLoCrois Monogatari II (Japan only) PoPoLoGue (Japan only) Robbit mon Dieu (Japan only) Saru! Get You! (Japan only) Syphon Filter (North America and PAL only)
 Tiny Bullets (Japan only) Twisted Metal 2 (North America and Japan only) Velldeselba Senki: Tsubasa no Kunshō (Japan only) Wipeout XI sai (Japan only) XI Jumbo (Japan only) 2008 

 Retail Buzz!: Brain Bender (PAL only) Buzz!: Master Quiz Coded Soul: Uketsugareshi Idea (Japan and South Korea only) Echochrome (Retail version in Japan and PAL only) Everybody's Golf Portable 2 God of War: Chains of Olympus (North America and PAL only) LocoRoco 2 MLB 08: The Show (North America and South Korea only) NBA 09: The Inside (North America only) Patapon Secret Agent Clank What Did I Do to Deserve This, My Lord? (Japan only) PlayStation Network Brain Challenge (North America only) Everyday Shooter Flow Mainichi Issho Portable (Japan only) Super Stardust Portable Game Archives Addie no Okurimono: To Moze from Addie (Japan only) Crash Bandicoot 2: Cortex Strikes Back Crash Bandicoot Carnival (Japan only) Crash Bandicoot: Warped Dig-a-Dig Pukka (Japan only) Docchi Mecha! (Japan only) Jet Moto Jet Moto 2 (North America and PAL only) Jet Moto 3 (North America only) Linda³ Again (Japan only) Magical Dice Kids (Japan only) Syphon Filter 3 (North America and PAL only) 2009 

 Retail Boku no Natsuyasumi 4: Seitouchi Shounen Tanteidan, Boku to Himitsu no Chizu (Japan only) Buzz!: Brain of the World (PAL only) Buzz!: Quiz World Chandrugpta: Warrior Prince (India only) Desi Adda: Games of India (India only) Enkaku Sōsa: Shinjitsu e no 23 Nichikan Ghostbusters: The Video Game (PAL only) Gran Turismo Invizimals (PAL and North America only) Jak and Daxter: The Lost Frontier LittleBigPlanet MLB 09: The Show (North America, Korea and Australia only) NBA 10 The Inside (North America only) MotorStorm: Arctic Edge Patapon 2 Resistance: Retribution PlayStation Network LocoRoco Midnight Carnival Numblast Pinball Heroes PixelJunk Monsters Deluxe (North America and PAL only) Savage Moon The Hera Campaign Game Archives Cool Boarders 2 (North America and PAL only) Cool Boarders 3 (North America only) Jumping Flash! 2 (North America and Japan only) Kula World (Japan and PAL only) Rapid Racer (Japan only) Syphon Filter 2 (North America and PAL only) Wild Arms 2 (North America and Japan only) 2010 

 Retail Echoshift (Retail version in Japan and PAL only) Everybody's Tennis Portable EyePet Fat Princess: Fistful of Cake (PAL and North America only) God of War: Ghost of Sparta Invizimals: Shadow Zone (PAL and North America only) Jungle Party MLB 10: The Show (North America and Korea only) ModNation Racers Patito Feo: el juego màs bonito (PAL only: Spain, Portugal and Italy) SOCOM U.S. Navy SEALs: Fireteam Bravo 3 Street Cricket Champions (India only) The Eye of Judgment: Legends (Retail version in Japan and PAL only) PlayStation Network Everybody's Stress Buster (Retail version in Japan and Asia only) Gravity Crash No Heroes Allowed! (Retail version in Japan only) Patchwork Heroes (Retail version in Japan only)Announcing Patchwork Heroes for PSP. PlayStation.Blog
 Pinball Heroes Bundle 2 Game Archives 40 Winks (PAL only) Arc Arena: Monster Tournament (North America and Japan only) Arc the Lad (North America and Japan only) Arc the Lad II (North America and Japan only) Crash Team Racing Critical Depth (PAL only) Gunparade March (Japan only) Kurushi Final (PAL only) 2011 

 Retail Buzz!: The Ultimate Music Quiz (PAL only) Disney•Pixar Cars 2 (PAL and North America only) Cart Kings (India only) EyePet Adventures (PAL only) Geronimo Stilton in The Kingdom of Fantasy The Videogame (Retail version in PAL, download only in North America) Invizimals: The Lost Tribes (Retail version in PAL, download only in North America) MLB 11: The Show (North America, South Korea and Australia only) Patapon 3 The Mystery Team (PAL only) White Knight Chronicles: Origins (Japan and PAL only) Game Archives Arc the Lad III (North America and Japan only) Fire Panic (Japan only) Motor Toon Grand Prix Nightmare Creatures (Japan only) Rally Cross (Japan and PAL only) 2012 

 Retail Geronimo Stilton: Return to The Kingdom of Fantasy The Videogame (Retail version in PAL, download only in North America) Phineas and Ferb: Across the 2nd Dimension (PAL and North America only) Street Cricket Champions 2 (India only) Game Archives Spyro the Dragon Spyro 2: Ripto's Rage! Spyro: Year of the Dragon (North America and PAL only) The Legend of Dragoon (North America and Japan only) UmJammer Lammy Warhawk Wild Arms 2013 

 Retail Don 2: The Game (India only) PlayStation Network Invizimals: Hidden Challenges (PAL only) Game Archives Doko Demo Issho (Japan only) Doko Demo Issho Tsuika Disc: Koneko Mo Issyo (Japan only) Twisted Metal (North America and PAL only) 2014 

 Game Archives Brightis (Japan only) Pocket Jiman (Japan only) Pocket MūMū (Japan only) Vib-Ribbon PlayStation Vita 

 2012 

 Retail Everybody's Golf 6 Gravity Rush LittleBigPlanet PS Vita Little Deviants MLB 12: The Show (Retail version in North America, Korea and Australia, download only in PAL) ModNation Racers: Road Trip PlayStation All-Stars Battle Royale Reality Fighters Resistance: Burning Skies Smart As... Uncharted: Golden Abyss Unit 13 Wipeout 2048 PlayStation Network Cliff Diving Ecolibrium Escape Plan Fireworks Frobisher Says! Hustle Kings MotorStorm RC Paint Park Plants vs. Zombies (Published by Sony Online Entertainment in North America and PAL only) PulzAR Sound Shapes Super Stardust Delta t@g Table Football Table Ice Hockey Table Top Tanks Top Darts Travel Bug Treasure Park Uncharted: Fight for Fortune When Vikings Attack! 2013 

 Retail Disney Epic Mickey 2: The Power of Two (Retail version in PAL, download only in North America) Invizimals: The Alliance (Retail version in PAL, download only in North America) Jak and Daxter Trilogy Killzone: Mercenary MLB 13: The Show (Retail version in North America, Korea and Australia, download only in PAL) Sly Cooper: Thieves in Time Soul Sacrifice Tearaway The Walking Dead: The Complete First Season PlayStation Network Bentley's Hackpack Doki-Doki Universe Flow Flower Jacob Jones and the Bigfoot Mystery Imaginstruments Invizimals Hidden Challenges (PAL only) Malicious Rebirth Open Me! Paint Park Plus PlayStation Home Arcade Ratchet & Clank: Full Frontal Assault Table Mini Golf Wake-up Club 2014 

 Retail Borderlands 2 Disney's The Muppets Movie Adventures (Retail version in PAL, download only in North America next year Freedom Wars God of War Collection Invizimals: The Resistance (Retail version in PAL, download only in North America) LittleBigPlanet PS Vita: Marvel Super Hero Edition (Retail version in PAL, download only in North America) Minecraft (Retail version in PAL, download code only in North America) MLB 14: The Show (Retail version in North America, download only in PAL) PlayStation Vita Pets (Retail version in PAL, download only in North America) Ratchet & Clank Collection (Retail version in PAL, download only in North America) The Sly Collection PlayStation Network CounterSpy Dead Nation Destiny of Spirits Entwined Hohokum Lemmings Touch Murasaki Baby No Heroes Allowed: No Puzzles Either! Resogun Soul Sacrifice Delta (Retail version in Japan and Hong Kong only) The Hungry Horde The Unfinished Swan 2015 

 Retail Looney Tunes Galactic Sports! (PAL only) MLB 15: The Show (Download code only in North America) Moe Chronicle (Asia only) Phineas and Ferb: Day of Doofenshmirtz (Retail version in PAL, download only in North America) PlayStation Network BigFest Disney's The Muppets Movie Adventures (Download only in North America, released in PAL the previous year) Fat Princess: Piece of Cake Helldivers Oreshika: Tainted Bloodlines (Retail version in Japan and Hong Kong only) Run Sackboy! Run! MonsterBag toio 

 2019 

 Retail GoGo Robottopuroguramingu ~Rojībo No Himitsu~ Kōsaku Seibutsu Gezunroido 〜Min'nade Motto Tanoshimeru〜 Toio Korekushon Kakuchō Pakku Toio Doraibu Toio Korekushon 2020 

 Retail Dai Maō No Bijutsukan to Kaitō-Dan On Gaku de Asobou Pikotonzu Windows 

 1997 

 Twisted Metal 2 (North America only) Jet Moto (North America only) 2015 

 Helldivers 2016 

 Everybody's Gone to the Rapture 2018 

 Guns Up! 2019 

 ReadySet Heroes 2020 

 Horizon Zero Dawn 
 Predator: Hunting Grounds 2021 

 Days Gone 2022 

 God of War 
 Marvel's Spider-Man: Miles Morales Marvel's Spider-Man Remastered Sackboy: A Big Adventure Uncharted: Legacy of Thieves Collection

 2023 

 Returnal Announced for 2023 

 The Last of Us Part I iOS/Android 

 2013 

 Knack's Quest (Published under PlayStation Mobile) Ratchet & Clank: Before the Nexus (Published under PlayStation Mobile) 2014 

 Invizimals: Hidden Challenges (Published under PlayStation Mobile) Invizimals: New Alliance (Published under PlayStation Mobile) Invizimals: Revolution (Published under PlayStation Mobile) PS Vita Pets: Puppy Parlour (Published under PlayStation Mobile) Run Sackboy! Run! (Published under PlayStation Mobile) 2015 

 Fat Princess: Piece of Cake (Published under PlayStation Mobile) 2016 

 Invizimals: Battle Hunters (Published under PlayStation Mobile) Uncharted: Fortune Hunter (Published under PlayStation Mobile) 2017 

 Mingol (Published by ForwardWorks) (Japan only) Sora to Umi no Aida (Published by ForwardWorks) (Japan only) 2018 

 Arc the Lad R (Published by ForwardWorks) (Japan only) Lemmings (Published under PlayStation Mobile) No Heroes Allowed! DASH! (Published by ForwardWorks) (Japan only) Wild Arms: Million Memories (Published by ForwardWorks) (Japan only) 2019 

 Disgaea RPG (Published by ForwardWorks) (Japan only) Kendama no Gon Jiro Fit & Run (Published by ForwardWorks) (Japan only) Toro to Puzzle: Doko Demo Issyo (Published by ForwardWorks) (Japan only) 2020 

 World Witches: United Front (Published by ForwardWorks) (Japan only) 2021 

 Nyorokko (Published by ForwardWorks) (Japan only) 2022 

 Wipeout Rush (Published under PlayStation Mobile) (PAL only) 2023 

 Ultimate Sackboy (Published under PlayStation Mobile)''

See also
Sony Interactive Entertainment
SIE Worldwide Studios
List of Xbox Game Studios video games
List of products published by Nintendo

Notes

References

External links
Sony Interactive Entertainment Inc.
SIE Worldwide Studios

 
Sony Computer Entertainment